= Melvin Mooney Distinguished Technology Award =

Award for contributions to rubber science

The Melvin Mooney Distinguished Technology Award is a professional award conferred by the ACS Rubber Division. Established in 1983, the award is named after Melvin Mooney, developer of the Mooney viscometer and of the Mooney-Rivlin hyperelastic law. The award consists of an engraved plaque and prize money. The medal honors individuals "who have exhibited exceptional technical competency by making significant and repeated contributions to rubber science and technology".

== Recipients ==
=== 1980s ===
- 1982 J. Roger Beatty – Senior Research Fellow at B. F. Goodrich known for development of rubber testing instruments and methods
- 1983 Aubert Y. Coran – Monsanto researcher responsible for invention of thermoplastic elastomer Geolast
- 1984 Eli M. Dannenberg – Cabot scientist known for contributions to surface chemistry of carbon black
- 1985 William M. Hess – Columbian Chemicals Company scientist known for contributions to characterization of carbon black dispersion in rubber
- 1986 Albert M. Gessler – ExxonMobil researcher known for development of elastomeric thermoplastics
- 1987 Avrom I. Medalia – Cabot scientist known for contributions to understanding electrical conductivity and dynamic properties of carbon black filled rubbers
- 1988 John G. Sommer – GenCorp scientist and author of popular texts on rubber technology
- 1989 Joginder Lal – Goodyear Polymer Research Manager and expert in the synthesis and mechanism of the formation of high polymers.

=== 1990s ===
- 1990 Gerard Kraus – Phillips Petroleum Scientist known for developing testing standard for carbon black surface area
- 1991 Charles S. Schollenberger – B. F. Goodrich chemist who invented Estane
- 1992 Robert W. Layer – B. F. Goodrich chemist noted for contributions to chemistry of imines
- 1993 John R. Dunn – Polysar synthetic rubber research chemist
- 1994 Noboru Tokita – Uniroyal and later Cabot scientist known for studying processing of elastomers
- 1995 Edward N. Kresge – Exxon Chief Polymer Scientist who developed tailored molecular weight density EPDM elastomers
- 1997 Russell A. Livigni – Gencorp scientist known for discovery and development of barium-based catalysts for the polymerization of butadiene and its copolymerization with styrene to give high trans rubbers with low vinyl content
- 1998 Henry Hsieh – Phillips Petroleum scientist known for contributions to polymerization chemistry
- 1999 Avraam I. Isayev – University of Akron Distinguished Professor of Polymer Science known for widely used texts on rheology and polymer molding technology, as well as for development of technology for ultrasonic devulcanization of tire rubber.

=== 2000s ===
- 2000 Joseph Kuczkowski – Goodyear chemist who elucidated mechanisms of antioxidant function, resulting in the commercialization of several new antioxidant systems
- 2002 C. Michael Roland – Naval Research Lab scientist recognized for blast and impact protection using elastomers, and for diverse contributions to elastomer science
- 2003 Walter H. Waddell – Exxon scientist recognized for his work on tire innerliner technology
- 2004 Oon Hock Yeoh – Freudenberg Scientist known for contributions to nonlinear elasticity and fracture mechanics
- 2005 Kenneth F. Castner – Senior Research and Development Associate at Goodyear Tire & Rubber Company known for his work in nickel catalyzed diene polymerization for the synthesis of high cis-polybutadiene
- 2006 Meng-Jaio Wang – Cabot scientist known for studies of carbon black
- 2007 Daniel L. Hertz Jr. – President of Seals Eastern and NASA consultant on the Space Shuttle Challenger disaster
- 2008 Robert P. Lattimer – Lubrizol Advanced Materials research and development technical fellow
- 2009 Frederick Ignatz-Hoover – Eastman technology fellow and 9th editor of Rubber Chemistry and Technology

=== 2010s ===
- 2010 William J. van Ooij – University of Cincinnati professor known for elucidating the mechanisms of brass-rubber adhesion in tires
- 2011 Periagaram S. Ravishankar – Exxon Senior Staff Engineer recognized for development of Vistalon EPDM elastomers
- 2012 Robert Schuster – former director of the German Institute for Rubber Technology (DIK) and popular lecturer on rubber technology
- 2014 Shingo Futamura – Materials scientist noted for his concept of the Deformation Index
- 2015 Alan H. Muhr – TARRC scientist noted for contributions to understanding the mechanics elastomer applications, including laminated rubber isolators, marine fenders, automotive mounts, and structural energy dissipation systems
- 2016 Dane Parker – Goodyear Tire & Rubber Company researcher known for developing a single-step process for converting Nitrile latex to HNBR latex
- 2017 David J. Lohse – ExxonMobil Materials Scientist known for contributions on thermodynamics of mixing, nanocomposites for controlling permeability, neutron scattering of polymers, rheology of polymers
- 2018 Joseph Padovan – University of Akron Distinguished Professor known for pioneering finite element procedures for analysis of rolling tires.
- 2019 Manfred Klüppel – German Institute for Rubber Technology department head of Material Concepts and Modeling group

=== 2020s ===
- 2020 Kenneth T. Gillen – Sandia National Labs researcher noted for contributions to service life prediction methods for elastomers
- 2021 Howard Colvin – Organic chemist and consultant to the tire and rubber industries noted for developments to rubber chemicals and polymers
- 2022 Anil K. Bhowmick – University of Houston professor known for contributions to polymer nanocomposites, thermoplastic elastomers, sustainability, adhesion, failure and degradation of rubbers and rubber technology
- 2023 Anke Blume – engineering technology professor at the University of Twente known for her contributions to silica and silane chemistry for rubber applications.
- 2024 Andrew V. Chapman – TARRC scientist noted for contributions to AFM microscopy of tire tread compounds.
- 2025 Sunny Jacob – ExxonMobil scientist known for leading the development of Thermoplastic vulcanizates products and processes.
- 2026 William V. Mars – Founder of elastomer durability simulation software company Endurica.

== See also ==
- International Rubber Science Hall of Fame: Another ACS award
- Rubber Chemistry and Technology: An ACS journal
- List of chemistry awards
- Sparks–Thomas award
- Charles Goodyear Medal
