= Joseph D. Walter =

American tire industry engineer and executive

Joseph D. Walter is a retired American tire industry mechanical engineering researcher and former Bridgestone executive.

== Education ==
Walter completed his doctoral degree in mechanical engineering at Virginia Tech in 1966, where he had also completed his undergraduate degree.

== Career ==
While employed by The Firestone Tire and Rubber company, Walter developed an approach for computing elastic properties of tire composite materials. He also famously studied rolling resistance. He previously served as vice president of the Bridgestone Americas Research Center in Akron and president of the Bridgestone European Technical Center in Rome. Upon retirement from Bridgestone in 1999, Walter taught vehicle dynamics and mechanics of materials as an adjunct professor at The University of Akron. Walter served on the editorial board of the scientific journal Tire Science and Technology for 35 years. He was a member of National Academies of Science committees formed to study 1) Fuel Efficiency of Automobiles and Light Trucks (1991-92) and 2) the National Tire Efficiency Study (2005-06). He also served on the boards of Edison Polymer Innovation Corp. (1990-94) and Bridgestone Europe (1994-99).

In 2006 Walter coedited, with Alan N. Gent, a NHTSA published reference text titled 'The Pneumatic Tire', which updated Clark's popular text 'Mechanics of Pneumatic Tires'.

== Awards ==
- 2022 - Tire Society Distinguished Service Award
