= Takashi Akasaka =

Japanese tire industry engineer

Takashi Akasaka (1925-2010) was a Japanese engineering professor at Chuo University known for his work on cord-rubber composites and tires.

== Education ==
Akasaka completed his undergraduate studies during world war II, graduating from the Applied Mathematics Section of the Engineering Department of the University of Tokyo in 1946. He was first in his class in the Astronautics Department but because research in Aeronautical Engineering was prohibited in Japan after the war, the Astronautics Department was reorganized as the Applied Mathematics Department. Not finding employment, Akasaka continued at the University of Tokyo as an assistant to Tsuyoshi Hayashi, who was working on tires. Akasaka received a doctorate degree in 1962 from the University of Tokyo at the age of 37. His dissertation developed a theory of cord-rubber composites based on an assumption of inextensible cords.

== Career ==
Akasaka joined the faculty of Chuo University in 1952 as a lecturer, teaching mathematics. In 1962 he joined the engineering department, teaching mechanics of materials. Along with Joseph Padovan, he was a founding associate editor and the longest serving associate editor of the journal Tire Science and Technology with 36 years. He delivered the 1989 invited plenary address at the Tire Society conference. He retired from the university in 1995 and remained an honorary faculty member.

His most cited work derived analytical equations describing the contact pressure distribution of a radial tire rolling with a camber angle.

== Awards ==
- 2011 - Tire Society Distinguished Achievement Award The award was made posthumously, and Akasaka's son Shuichi Akasaka accepted the award at the meeting.
