= Robert W. Layer =

American engineer (1928-2022)

Robert Wesley Layer (August 11, 1928-December 3, 2022) was a B. F. Goodrich chemist noted for contributions to chemistry of imines and for chemical stabilization of elastomers.

== Early life and education ==
Layer was born in 1928 in Brooklyn, New York. He earned a BA in chemistry at New York University, and in 1955 a doctorate in chemistry from the University of Cincinnati.

== Career ==
Layer worked for 39 years as a research chemist at the B.F. Goodrich Company in Brecksville.

He originated several patents on the chemical stabilization of elastomers. He collaborated with Robert Lattimer on rubber additives for protecting against ozone attack.

== Awards and recognitions ==
- 1992 - Melvin Mooney Distinguished Technology Award from the ACS Rubber Division
