= Charles S. Schollenberger =

American chemist

Charles Sundy Schollenberger (August 8, 1922 - January 25, 2002) was an American chemist. He invented the first thermoplastic polyurethane (Estane).

== Early life ==
Schollenberger was born in 1922, on the campus of the Ohio Agricultural Research and Development Center in Wooster, to agronomist Charles Jay and Anne (Sundy) Schollenberger. His childhood interest in chemistry began when his father let him perform experiments in his lab.

Schollenberger graduated from Wooster High School in 1940. He earned an AB degree in chemistry from the College of Wooster in 1943. He completed his doctoral degree in organic chemistry in 1947 at Cornell University.

On October 15, 1949, he married Katharine Rosanne Kennon. In 2009, son Charles David Schollenberger set up the Charles Schollenberger Arboretum Visitors Center Biological Lab Endowment at Ohio State University.

== Career ==
Schollenberger was hired at B. F. Goodrich in 1947 by Waldo Semon, helping to open a new research center in Brecksville, Ohio in 1948. In 1952, Schollenberger patented the first thermoplastic polyurethane. He continued developing the product until 1958 when the new material debuted under the trade name Estane. It is a strong, flexible, abrasion-resistant material that was used in textile coatings, tennis shoe soles, automobile parts, as well as magnetic tape. Schollenberg was promoted to R&D Fellow - the highest research position at Goodrich in 1975. He was a prolific inventor, with 18 U.S. and 10 foreign patents. Schollenberger retired in 1984, when Estane accounted for roughly one third of specialty chemical sales at the company.

== Recognition ==
- 1989 - Urethane Medal from Great Britain's Plastics and Rubber Group
- 1991 - Melvin Mooney Distinguished Technology Award from Rubber Division of the ACS
