= Waldo Semon =

American inventor (1898-1999)

- Born: Waldo Lonsbury Semon; September 10, 1898; Demopolis, Alabama, U.S.
- Died: May 26, 1999 (aged 100); Hudson, Ohio, U.S.
- Education: University of Washington (B.S., Ph.D.)
- Known for: PVC
- Awards: Charles Goodyear Medal (1944); Elliott Cresson Medal (1964)
- Scientific career
- Fields: Chemistry

Waldo Lonsbury Semon (September 10, 1898 – May 26, 1999) was an American inventor born in Demopolis, Alabama. He is credited with inventing methods for making polyvinyl chloride useful.

== Biography ==
He was born on September 10, 1898.

He completed his education at the University of Washington, earning degrees in 1920 and 1924. His doctoral degree was among the first in the nation to be awarded in Chemical Engineering.

Semon is best known for plasticizing vinyl, the world's third most used plastic. He is also credited for being the first to commercialise plasticizers for vinyl, which greatly increased their utility, starting with dibutyl phthalate. He found the formula for vinyl by mixing a few synthetic polymers, and the result was a substance that was elastic, but wasn't adhesive. Semon worked on methods of improving rubber, and eventually developed a synthetic substitute. On December 11, 1935, he created Koroseal from salt, coke and limestone, a polymer that could be made in any consistency. Semon made more than 5,000 other synthetic rubber compounds, achieving success with Ameripol (AMERican POLymer) in 1940 for the B.F. Goodrich company. In all, Semon held 116 patents, and was inducted into the Invention Hall of Fame in 1995 at the age of 97.

While at B.F. Goodrich, Semon reported to Harry L. Fisher and later supervised Benjamin S. Garvey, both of whom also received the Charles Goodyear Medal. He hired Charles S. Schollenberger who received the Melvin Mooney Distinguished Technology Award.

Semon is sometimes credited with inventing bubble gum, but this is inaccurate. He did invent an indigestible synthetic rubber substance that could be used as a bubble gum (and produced exceptionally large bubbles), but the product remained a curiosity and was never sold. Semon graduated from the University of Washington earning a BS in chemistry and a PhD in chemical engineering.

He was awarded the Charles Goodyear Medal in 1944, the Elliott Cresson Medal in 1964, and the Golden Plate Award of the American Academy of Achievement in 1965. After retiring from B.F. Goodrich, he served as a research professor at Kent State University in Kent, Ohio. He died in Hudson, Ohio, on May 26, 1999, at the age of 100.

== Legacy ==
Waldo Semon Woods Conservation Area, is named in honor of the inventor, for his donation of land to Metro Parks, serving Summit County, Ohio. It is over 100 acres, with a pond where herons, turtles and amphibians are often seen.
