= PB Swiss Tools =

Swiss tool manufacturing company

PB Swiss Tools AG
- Work with the best
- Industry: Manufacturing
- Founded: Switzerland (1878)
- Founder: Paul Baumann
- Headquarters: Wasen, Sumiswald, Bern, Switzerland
- Key people: Eva Jaisli (President of the Board of Directors); Marco Baumann (CEO); Olaf Dähler (CCO); Jörg Boger (CTO)
- Products: Professional hand tools
- Number of employees: 150 (as of September 2017)
- Website: www.pbswisstools.com

PB Swiss Tools AG is a manufacturer of hand tools based in Switzerland.

The company was started in 1878 by Paul Baumann, from whose initials the company name was derived. In 1916 Paul Baumann established the family-owned company PB Baumann GmbH. In 1940 the company began producing tools, the first of which was a screwdriver. In 2011 medical devices were added to the portfolio. Today, 150 employees in Wasen and Sumiswald manufacture 12 million tools and instruments every year. More than two thirds of these are exported worldwide.

The "Classic" and "Multicraft" styles of tool handles are made of cellulose acetate butyrate and vanilla-scented to counteract the potentially unpleasant aroma of butyric acid that would otherwise form as the tools age. The "SwissGrip" and "ElectroTool" styles have handles made of Santoprene-coated polypropylene.

PB Swiss hand tools are individually serial-numbered, and the serial number can be used to search a database and find the date of manufacture for a given tool.

== Gallery ==
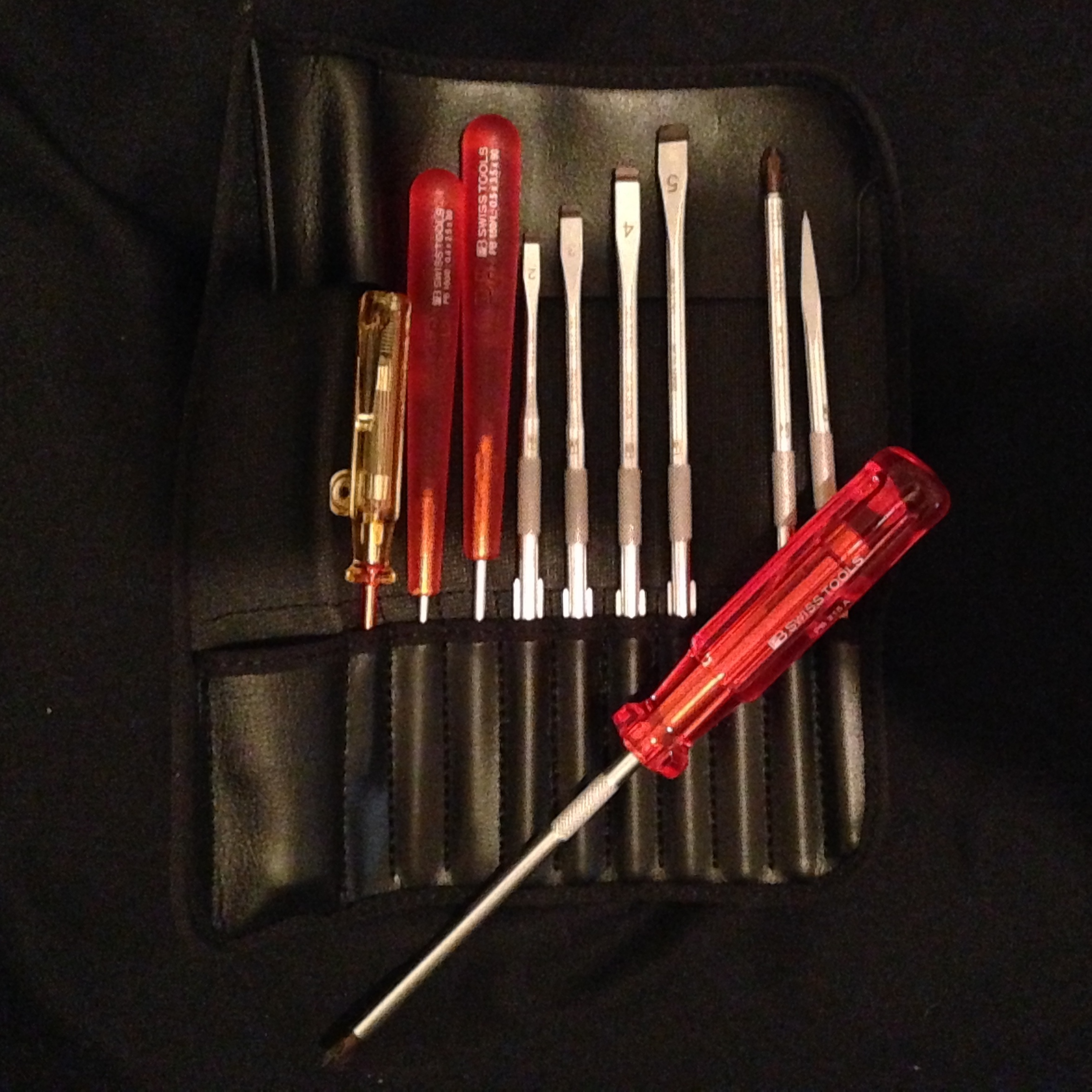
Set of interchangeable blade screwdrivers

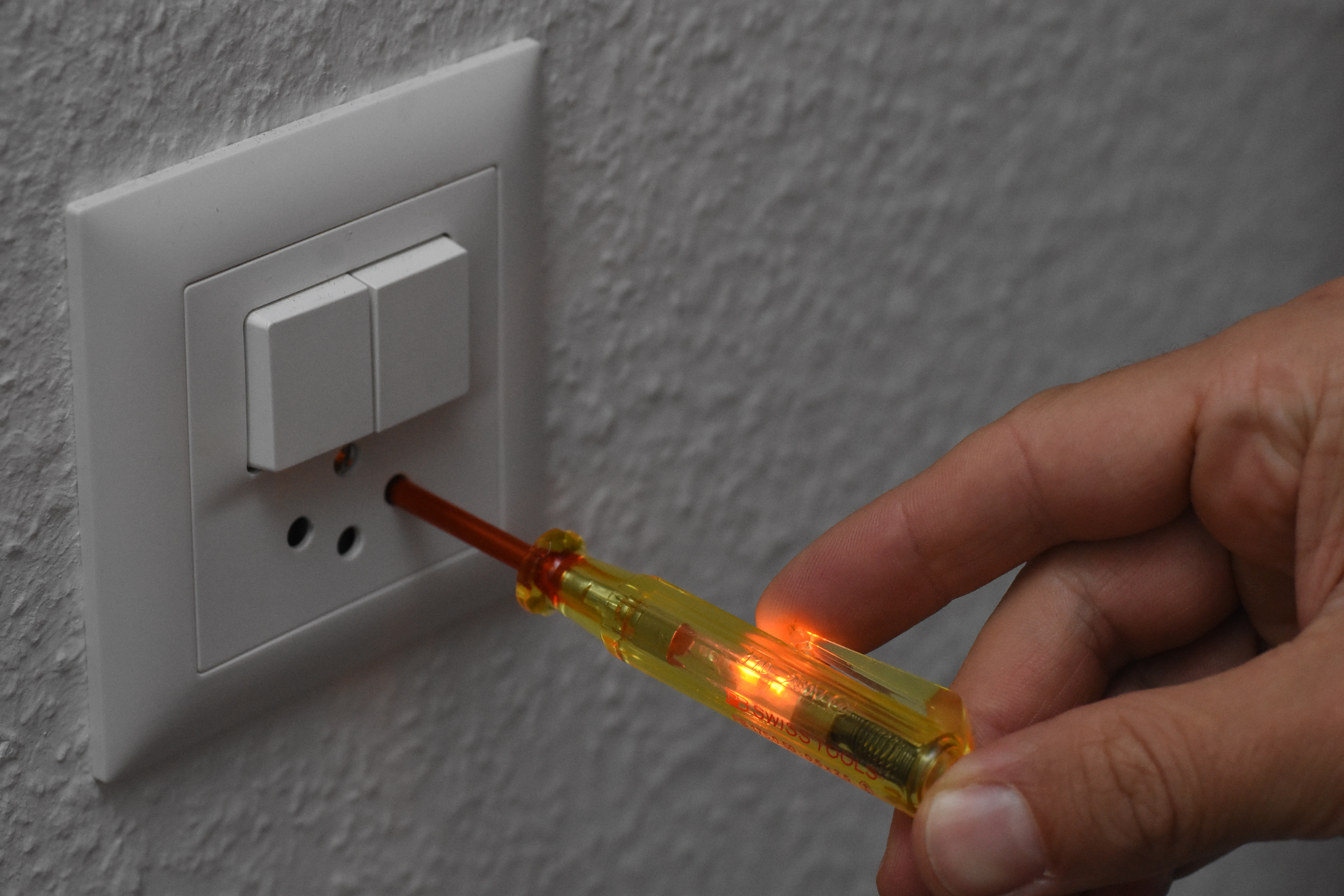
Voltage-test screwdriver

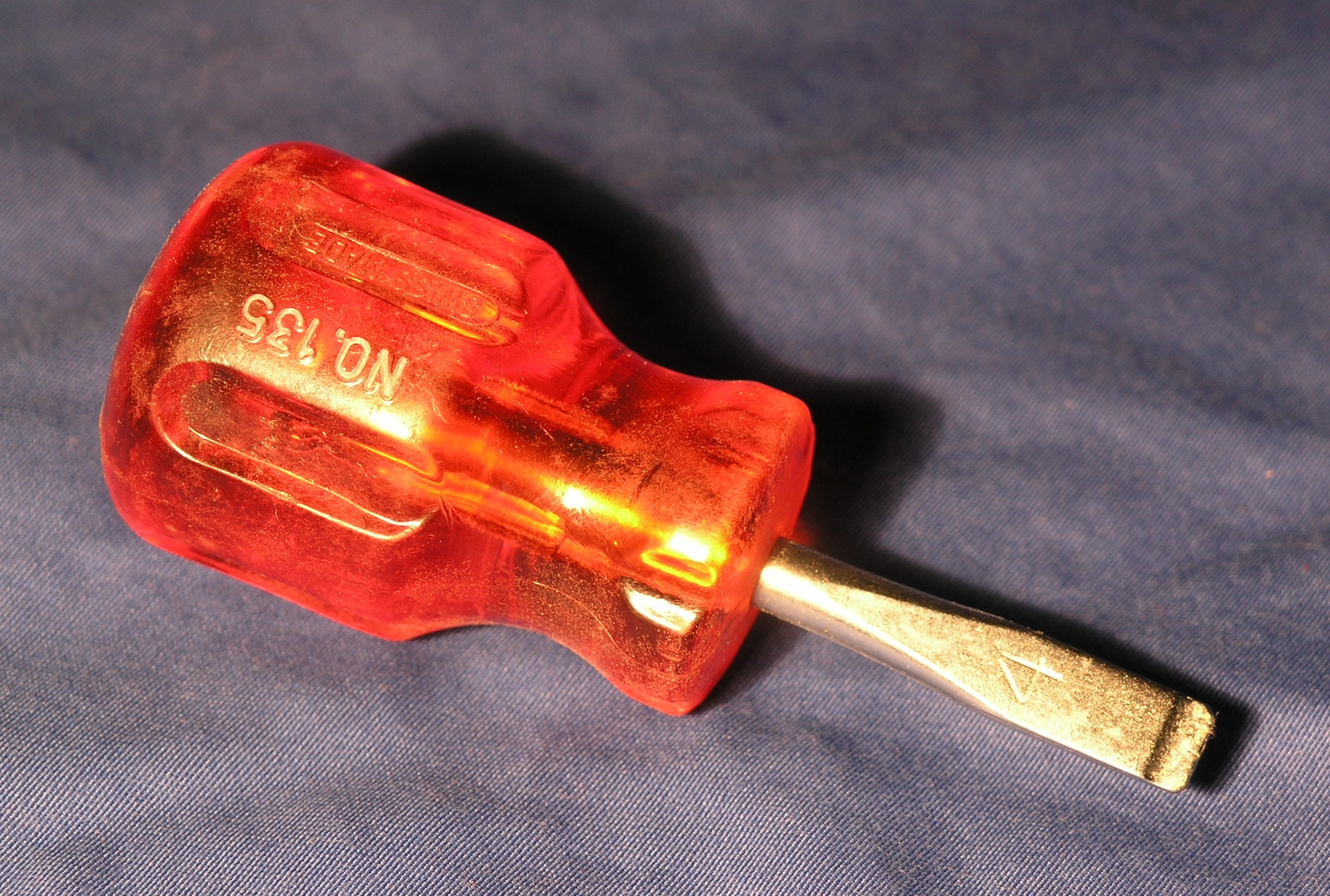
Screwdriver with short handle
