= Aubert Y. Coran =

American scientist (1932–2020)

Aubert Y. Coran (1932–2020) was an American scientist noted for his contributions to thermoplastic elastomers and vulcanization chemistry of rubber. In 1983, he won the Melvin Mooney Distinguished Technology Award, bestowed by the American Chemical Society to individuals "who have exhibited exceptional technical competency by making significant and repeated contributions to rubber science and technology". In 1995, the rubber division of the American Chemical Society bestowed on Coran the Charles Goodyear Medal in honor of his international contributions to polymer science and development.

== Personal ==
Coran was born March 24, 1932, in St. Louis, Missouri. He died on October 20, 2020, in Sarasota, Florida, at the age of 88.

== Education ==
In 1955, Coran received a Master of Science Degree from the St. Louis College of Pharmacy. He completed a doctorate degree in physical chemistry in 1992, at University of Haute-Alsace.

== Career ==
After receiving his MS, Coran went to work for Monsanto Company in St. Louis, Missouri, remaining with the company until his retirement in 1991. During his time with Monsanto, he researched the use of sulfur and accelerators in vulcanizing rubber and helped develop Santoprene, Santogard PVA and Vocol accelerator. In the years 1978–1983, Coran served as the 6th editor of the scientific journal Rubber Chemistry and Technology. In 1986, he managed future Eastman technology fellow Frederick Ignatz-Hoover. After his retirement from Monsanto, he took a position with the Institute of Polymer Engineering at the University of Akron, managing the EPIC-M.A. Hanna Polymer Blending and Compounding Center. In the mid-1990s, A. N. Gent wrote that Coran had "played the leading role in the remarkable progress made in rubber vulcanization since about 1960."

After departing the University of Akron in September 1991, Coran established a consultancy headquartered in Longboat, Florida.

== Honors and awards ==
Coran has received three awards from the American Chemical Society. In 1980, its Detroit division bestowed on him the Thomas Midgley award. In 1983, he received the Melvin Mooney Distinguished Technology Award. In 1995, the rubber division honored him with the Charles Goodyear Medal. He has also been acknowledged by the Plastics and Rubber Institute, which gave him its Colwyn medal in 1984.
