= Sudhin =

Sudhin is a given name. Notable people with the name include:

- Sudhin Das (1930–2017), Bangladeshi musician
- Sudhin Dasgupta (1929–1982), Indian music director, lyricist, and singer
- Sudhin Datta (born 1951), Indian scientist

== See also ==
- Sudhir
