= William J. van Ooij =

William J. van Ooij is a retired University of Cincinnati professor known for elucidating the mechanisms of brass-rubber adhesion in tires, and as the founder of corrosion resistant coatings company Ecosil Technologies

== Education ==
van Ooij completed his graduate education at Delft University of Technology in The Netherlands, earning his MS in chemical engineering in 1964 and his PhD in physical chemistry in 1971. He held a two-year post-doctoral position at Ames Laboratory at Iowa State University.

== Career ==
He returned to The Netherlands to work as a senior research chemist for Akzo Research Laboratories (now Akzo Nobel). \ After 12 years in this role, van Ooij returned to the United States first as a visiting professor in the Department of Materials Engineering at Virginia Polytechnic Institute & State University, and later at the Colorado School of Mines as a professor of chemistry. He then was employed for 4 years at Armco Research & Technologies (now AK Steel) as head of the Corrosion Group. He joined the Department of Materials Science and Engineering faculty in University of Cincinnati's College of Engineering in 1993. During his career, he published approximately 350 scientific and technical publications, and he obtained 30 U.S. and 38 European patents.

in 1987, van Ooij was a founding editor of the scientific journal Journal of Adhesion Science and Technology.

He was the Chief Technology Officer for Ecosil Technologies, a startup founded with Max Sorenson and David Fairbourn that has become a leader in the application of silane surface treatments for corrosion protection of metals. His inventions enabled the replacement of chromate and phosphate systems in metallic surface treatment lines, and were recognized by the US EPA for their significant impact on eliminating toxic and cancer-causing processes.

== Awards ==
- 2009 - Established Entrepreneur award from University of Cincinnati
- 2010 - Melvin Mooney Distinguished Technology Award from Rubber Division of the ACS
- 2010 - Ohio Patent Award from the Ohio Academy of Science
