= Avraam I. Isayev =

Avraam I. Isayev (born 1942) is a University of Akron professor of polymer engineering known for widely used texts on rheology and polymer molding technology, as well as for the development of technology for ultrasonic devulcanization of tire rubber.

== Education ==
Isayev was born in Azerbaijan and is a US citizen. He earned two master's degrees, the first in Chemical Engineering from Azerbaijan Institute of Oil and Chemistry in Baku (USSR) in 1964, and a second in applied mathematics from the Institute of Electronic Machine Building in Moscow (USSR) in 1975. He completed a doctorate in Polymer Engineering and Science at the Institute of Petrochemical Synthesis of the Academy of Sciences of the USSR in Moscow in 1970.

== Career ==
Isayev began his career in 1970 at the Institute of Petrochemical Synthesis of the Academy of Sciences in Moscow. In 1977, he joined the Israel Institute of Technology in Israel. He joined Cornell University in 1979. He joined the Polymer Engineering department at the University of Akron in 1983. He has been a visiting professor at Kyoto University, University of Aachen, and the University of Linz. During the period from 1990 to 2009, he was the director of the Molding Technology Research and Development Center (MOLDTECH). He is the editor-in-chief of the journal Advances in Polymer Technology.

== Awards ==
- Society of Plastics Engineers (SPE) Fellow
- OMNOVA Solutions Signature University Award from the OMNOVA Solutions Foundation
- 1996 Outstanding Researcher Award from the University of Akron
- 1999 Melvin Mooney Distinguished Technology Award from the Rubber Division of the ACS
- George Stafford Whitby Award from Rubber Division of the ACS
- Silver Medal from the Institute of Materials (London)
- 1999 Vinogradov Prize from the G. V. Vinogradov Society of Rheology (Moscow)
- NorTech Award given by Crain Publishers
- James L. White Award of Polymer Processing Society
- SPE International Award
