= David J. Lohse =

American materials scientist

David John Lohse is a retired ExxonMobil materials scientist known for contributions on thermodynamics of mixing, nanocomposites for controlling permeability, neutron scattering of polymers, rheology of polymers.

== Education ==
Lohse earned two B.S. degrees from Michigan State University in 1974: one in Physics and another in Computer Science. He then went on to earn a Ph.D. in materials science from the University of Illinois Urbana-Champaign in 1978. Following his graduate studies, he worked as a postdoc for two years at the National Bureau of Standards under an NSF-NRC Fellowship.

== Career ==
Lohse joined Exxon Mobil Corporation in 1980, starting in the Long Range Polymer Research Group. In 1987, he joined the Corporate Strategic Research Labs of ExxonMobil Research & Engineering Co where he worked with Edward Kresge and Sudhin Datta. He retired in 2011.

Lohse's research focused on the thermodynamics of mixing polymer blends, neutron scattering from polymers, the use of block and graft copolymers to enhance blend compatibility, the control of rheology by molecular architecture, nanocomposites, and improvement of polymer products. With Sudhin Datta, he published the textbook Polymeric Compatibilizers. His most cited works concern the connection between polymer molecular weight, density, chain dimensions and melt viscoelastic properties, and packing length in linear polymer melts.

== Awards ==
- 2000 Fellow of the American Physical Society
- 2005 PMSE Fellow
- 2010 ACS Fellow
- 2017 - Melvin Mooney Distinguished Technology Award from Rubber Division of the ACS
