= Walter H. Waddell =

Rubber and tire researcher

Walter H. Waddell is a retired ExxonMobil Chemical senior research associate and consultant to the tire and rubber industry with expertise in silica technology, rubber compounding, butyl polymer applications and tire aging. Since 2015 he has served on the technical committee of the International Tire Exhibition & Conference (ITEC) for Tire Manufacturing.

== Education ==
Waddell received his BS in Chemistry at University of Illinois Chicago in 1969 and his PhD from University of Houston in 1973. He held a postdoctoral research position at Columbia University until 1975.

== Career ==
Waddell's first professional post was as an associate professor of chemistry at Carnegie-Mellon University. In 1983 he joined Goodyear research as a section head. In 1990 he joined PPG Industries as a senior scientist developing silica technology. In 1996 he joined ExxonMobil as a senior research associate in specialty Polymers Technology, retiring in 2015. Following his retirement, he has consulted on rubber technology for Cheng Shin Rubber Industrial Co. Ltd. Oriental Silicas Corp. and Smithers. He holds an appointment as an adjunct professor at Beijing University of Chemical Technology. Since 2015 he has served on the technical committee of the International Tire Exhibition & Conference (ITEC) for Tire Manufacturing.

== Awards and recognition ==
- 1993 - Sparks–Thomas award
- 2003 - Melvin Mooney Distinguished Technology Award from the ACS Rubber Division
- 2020 - Harold Herzlich Distinguished Technology Achievement Medal
