= Frederick Ignatz-Hoover =

Frederick Ignatz-Hoover is an Eastman technology fellow and the ninth editor of Rubber Chemistry and Technology.

== Education ==
Ignatz-Hoover completed his undergraduate and graduate education in chemistry and Polymer Science at the University of Akron. His doctoral advisor was Roderic Quirk and his dissertation investigated the topic of anionic polymer synthesis. He serves on several academic advisory boards: the Florida Center for Heterocyclic Compounds at the University of Florida, the Center for Advanced Polymer Composites Engineering at Ohio State University, and the University of Akron's Department of Chemistry.

== Career ==
Ignatz-Hoover joined Monsanto in 1986, working under Aubert Y. Coran and continuing in technical roles as the business continued under the Solutia, Eastman and Flexsys brands. He is an expert in the use of sulfur and vulcanization chemistry in the rubber industry. His most cited work treated the subject of migration of chemical additives in rubber.

== Awards ==
- 2009 - Melvin Mooney Distinguished Technology Award from Rubber Division of the ACS
- 2025 - Harold Herzlich Distinguished Technology Achievement Medal
