= Harold Herzlich Distinguished Technology Achievement Medal =

The Harold Herzlich Distinguished Technology Achievement Medal is an award conferred that recognizes "innovators, who through persistence and dedication, have advanced a paradigm shift in tire manufacturing, tire reliability or performance". It is awarded as a part of the biennial ITEC tire show. Prior to 2012, it had been known by the name ITEC Distinguished Technology Achievement Award.

== Recipients ==
- 2012 - Marion Pottinger- American mechanical engineer known for his work on tire footprint mechanics, tire wear and tire force and moment behavior.
- 2014 - Bernhard Blümich - RWTH Aachen Professor who developed nondestructive NMR tire measurement technology
- 2016 - Andreas Limper - former HF Mixing executive and developer of mixing technology
- 2018 - Steven M. Cron - retired Michelin product research engineer and co-inventor of the Tweel.
- 2020 - Walter H. Waddell - retired ExxonMobil Chemical senior research associate and consultant to the tire and rubber industry with expertise in silica technology, rubber compounding, butyl polymer applications, and tire aging.
- 2022 - William V. Mars - Endurica founder and developer of software for simulating tire durability
- 2024 - Brendan Rodgers - retired ExxonMobil scientist known for work on tire curing bladder technology
- 2025 - Frederick Ignatz-Hoover - retired Flexsys scientist known for development of insoluable sulfur additives for use in rubber vulcanization.
