= Robert Schuster (rubber scientist) =

German rubber industry scientist

Robert Hans Schuster (born 8 September 1942) is the former director of the German Institute for Rubber Technology (DIK) and a popular lecturer on rubber technology.

== Education ==
Schuster earned a Dipl.-Chem. in 1967 from the Institute of Organic Chemistry at Alexandru Ioan Cuza University in Romania. He earned a Doctor of Science in February 1984 at the Staudinger Institute of Macromolecular Chemistry at the University of Freiburg with a dissertation on the topic of "thermodynamic investigations on polystyrene-solvent systems" under advisor H.J. Cantow.

== Career ==
From 1984 to 1992, Schuster led the Department of Chemistry and Physics of Elastomers at DIK. In 1992, he was appointed director of the DIK. He was also a lecturer at the Institute of Macromolecular Chemistry in the University of Hanover since 1987, and he held the rank of professor there since April 1996. His most cited work treats the subject of fractal filler networks in rubber.

== Awards ==
- 2012 - Melvin Mooney Distinguished Technology Award from Rubber Division of the ACS
