= Tire Society =

Professional body

The Tire Society is an American non-profit engineering society, based in Ohio, whose mission is to increase and disseminate knowledge as it pertains to the science and technology of tires. It hosts a two-day meeting and conference every year. In addition, it publishes a peer reviewed technical journal, Tire Science and Technology.

The Tire Society was founded on 24 March 1980. The current president is Xianwei Meng.

== Awards ==
The society has two professional award recognitions: the Distinguished Service Award and the Distinguished Achievement Award.

=== Distinguished Service Award Recipients ===
- 1990 Floyd Conant
- 1991 Frederick James Kovac
- 1996 David Benko
- 2005 Jozef DeEskinazi
- 2012 Marion Pottinger
- 2022 Joseph D. Walter
- 2026 Robert Pelle

=== Distinguished Achievement Award Recipients ===
- 2009 Samuel Kelly Clark
- 2011 Takashi Akasaka
- 2013 Hans Pacejka
- 2021 Timothy B. Rhyne and Steven M. Cron
- 2026 Joseph Padovan
