= Shingo Futamura =

Materials scientist

Shingo Futamura (April 3, 1938 -) is a rubber industry materials scientist noted for his concept of the deformation index.

== Education ==
Futamura completed his undergraduate Bachelor of Science degree at Waseda University in Japan. He earned a master's degree from the University of Michigan in 1968. He received his doctorate in polymer science from the University of Akron in 1975 under advisor Eberhard Meinecke.

== Career ==
By 1974, Futamura was appointed as a group leader of polymer physics at Firestone Central Research in Akron, Ohio. During a career spanning over 40 years, Futamura authored 25 scientific papers and 50 US patents. He worked for Nippon Zeon Co., Firestone Tire & Rubber Company, and Goodyear Tire & Rubber Company.

He is best known for proposing the concept of a deformation index to relate viscoelastic properties to real-world tire performance. The concept is used to select rubber compounds that minimize tire rolling resistance, and it is used in finite element analysis to simplify the calculation of energy loss and temperature distribution.

== Awards and recognition ==
- 1973 - Honorable Mention award for paper entitled "Solution SBR-Study in Copolymerization Dynaimcs", ACS Rubber Division Spring meeting
- 2014 - Melvin Mooney Distinguished Technology Award from the ACS Rubber Division
