= Joginder Lal =

American polymer chemist (1923-1998)

- Born: July 23, 1923; Amritsar, India
- Died: September 2, 1998 (aged 75)
- Education: Hindu College, Amritsar
- Scientific career
- Workplaces: Goodyear Tire and Rubber Company

Joginder Lal (2 July 1923 – 2 September 1998) was a Goodyear Polymer Research Manager and expert in the synthesis and mechanism of the formation of high polymers.

== Education ==
Lal was born in 1923 in Amritsar, India. He completed his undergraduate education at Hindu College, Amritsar. In 1946, he won a scholarship to pursue graduate education in the United States. In 1951, he married Ardyce Lundenburg, a music student, and completed his doctorate in polymer chemistry at the Polytechnic Institute of Brooklyn.

== Career ==
Following completion of the requirements for his doctorate, he worked briefly for the Polaroid Corporation in Cambridge, Massachusetts. His scholarship contract required that he return to India, however, so following graduation he took up a teaching position at Hindu College in Amritsar. He held that position for a year before returning to the United States and his wife. They moved to Philadelphia, where he headed polymer-organic research for H.D. Justi and Son, a manufacturer of dental materials. In 1956, he joined Goodyear Tire and Rubber Company in Akron, Ohio as a research scientist where he worked on synthesis and properties of rubber, plastics and coating materials. His team developed Hexsyn, a highly flexible and durable polymer in 1967. Hexsyn was applied for medical applications including a heart pump diaphragm at the Cleveland Clinic in 1976, and a prothesis for finger joint replacement in cases of arthritis or injury. Lal chaired the Gordon Conference on Elastomers in 1983. He published a widely used text with James E. Mark on the topic of rubber elasticity. He headed the Polymer Research group at Goodyear from 1975 to 1982, and retired with the titled of Senior Research Associate in 1985. Lal was inducted into the Goodyear Inventors Hall of Fame. In 1987, he joined the University of Akron as an adjunct professor in the Institute of Biomedical Engineering.

He served as science counselor to congressman John F. Seiberling from 1974 to 1986.

== Awards and recognitions ==
- 1989 Melvin Mooney Distinguished Technology Award
- 1990 Distinguished Award of Council, ACESS
- 1996 Harry and Carol Mosher Award recognizing outstanding work in chemistry
