= Russell A. Livigni =

Russell A. Livigni (born 20 July 1934) is a rubber industry scientist and executive noted for his discovery and development of high trans styrene-butadiene rubber, a crystallizing rubber that provides superior oxidation resistance relative to natural rubber.

== Education ==
Livigni is a native of Akron, Ohio. His aptitude for scientific work was recognized early - in high school he won the Bausch and Lomb award in science. He graduated from Kenmore High School in 1952. After graduation, he took a job at the Firestone Tire and Rubber Company's synthetic rubber development lab, while also working towards his undergraduate degree. He completed his B.Sc. in chemistry in 1956, and his Ph.D. in polymer chemistry in 1960. Both degrees were earned at the University of Akron. During his time as an undergraduate, he worked in the university's Institute of Rubber Research.

== Career ==
- 1961 - joined GenCorp as a senior research chemist
- 1962-1963 - Group leader, polymer characterization
- 1963-1975 - Section Head, Materials Chemistry and Polymer Characterization
- 1975-1980 - Manager, Polymer and Analytical Chemistry
- 1980-1987 - Associate Director of Research
- 1988-1995 - Vice President and Director, GenCorp Research
- 1995 - Vice-President, Corporate Technology
- 1996 - retired to consult for Omnova, a GenCorp spinoff

Livigni holds 37 patents. His most cited work treated the subject of polymerization of butadiene and isoprene with butyllithium initiator.

== Awards ==
- 1997 - Melvin Mooney Distinguished Technology Award.
- 2013 - Charles Goodyear Medal of the Rubber Division of the American Chemical Society.
