= Manfred Klüppel =

German materials physicist

Manfred Klüppel is a retired German Institute for Rubber Technology department head of Material Concepts and Modeling group known for his development of theories of contact mechanics on fractal surfaces and of reinforcement by fillers of elastomers.

== Early life and education ==
Klüppel completed undergraduate studies in physics at Philipps University of Marburg in 1982, and a doctorate in theoretical physics in 1987.

== Career ==
Klüppel started as a research associate with the German Institute for Rubber Technology in 1989 working on rubber's rheological behavior. In 2002, he became the head of the material concepts and modeling department. He was simultaneously a lecturer at the Leibniz University Hannover, where he taught elastomer physics and rubber technology. He was promoted to full Professor of Polymer Materials in 2013.

His long collaboration with Gert Heinrich produced a multi-scale contact mechanics theory for fractal surfaces, which was recognized by the tire industry for its predictions of tire traction in both dry and wet conditions. Also a fractal theory of rubber reinforcement by fillers.

== Awards and recognitions ==
- 2013 - Honorary Professor at Leibniz University Hannover
- 2017 - Colwyn medal
- 2019 - Melvin Mooney Distinguished Technology Award from the ACS Rubber Division
- 2022 - Carl-Dietrich-Harries Medal of the German Rubber Society
