= Marion Pottinger =

American tire industry engineer

Marion G. Pottinger is an American mechanical engineer known for his work on tire footprint mechanics, tire wear and tire force and moment behavior.

== Education ==
Pottinger holds a BS in mechanical engineering from the University of Cincinnati and an MS (1963) and a PhD (1966) in mechanical engineering from Purdue University.

== Career ==
Pottinger began his career with the research and development unit at B.F. Goodrich, rising to the rank of senior manager. In 1985 he joined Uniroyal Goodrich Tire Company, where he held an Associate R&D Fellow position responsible for development of high performance tires and for measurements of tire wear. In 1988 he joined Smithers Scientific Services. He retired from Smithers in 2003 as Technical Director. In retirement, he operated a private consulting company M'gineering.

Pottinger served as president of the Tire Society and was a member of several SAE committees: the Highway Tire Forum Committee, the Vehicle Dynamics Standards Committee, and the Chassis and Suspension Committee. He was a member of the ASTM F-09 Committee on Tires. Pottinger served as a member of a Transportation Research Board committee that was influential in writing legislation on tire energy consumption labeling.

His most cited work gives a model for combined tire cornering and braking forces.

== Awards ==
- 2012 - Harold Herzlich Distinguished Technology Achievement Medal
- 2012 - Tire Society Distinguished Service Award
- 2014 - Tire Technology International Lifetime Achievement Award
- 2015 - James M Crawford Technical Standards Board Outstanding Achievement Award from SAE International
