= William M. Hess =

Chemical scientist

William Manert Hess (April 28, 1928 – August 22, 2017) was a Columbian Chemicals Company scientist known for contributions to characterization of carbon black dispersion in rubber.

== Education ==
Hess completed his education at Long Island University.

== Career ==
Hess joined the Columbian Chemicals Company in 1950. He was promoted to the position of manager of the Columbian Physics Laboratory in 1955. He was promoted to Senior Scientist in 1961. Hess retired in 1987, but continued as a consultant until his death.

Hess was a prolific researcher and author in the area of carbon black technology. His most cited work investigated the application of electron microscopy to the study of carbon black. His works on characterizing the distribution and dispersion of carbon black in rubber and its blends, and on the application of fractal descriptors are also highly cited. He was the 1985 recipient of the Melvin Mooney Distinguished Technology Award from the ACS Rubber Division. He received the 1993 Lavoisier Medal of the Société Chimique de France. He received an Honoris Causa Doctorate from the University of Haute-Alsace in Mulhouse France in 2000.
