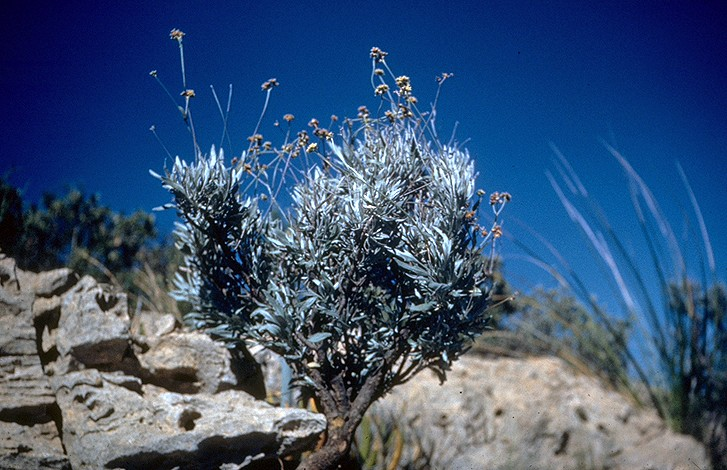

Conservation status
- Secure (NatureServe)

Scientific classification
- Kingdom: Plantae
- Clade: Tracheophytes
- Clade: Angiosperms
- Clade: Eudicots
- Clade: Asterids
- Order: Asterales
- Family: Asteraceae
- Tribe: Heliantheae
- Genus: Parthenium
- Species: P. argentatum

Binomial name
- Parthenium argentatum A.Gray

= Parthenium argentatum =

Species of plant

Parthenium argentatum, commonly known as the guayule (/ɡwaɪˈuːliː/ or /waɪˈuːleɪ/, as in Spanish), is a perennial woody shrub in the family Asteraceae that is native to the rangeland area of the Chihuahuan Desert; including the southwestern United States and northern Mexico. It was first documented by J.M. Bigelow in 1852 through the Mexican Boundary Survey and was first described by Asa Gray. Natural rubber, ethanol, non-toxic adhesives, and other specialty chemicals can be extracted from guayule. An alternative source of latex that is hypoallergenic, unlike the normal Hevea rubber, can also be extracted. While Castilla elastica was the most widely used rubber source of Mesoamericans in pre-Columbian times, guayule was also used, though less frequently. The name "guayule" derives from the Nahuatl word ulli/olli, "rubber".

== Description and range ==
Guayule grows in rocky, limestone desert areas in full sun. The plant's outer branches and leaves are covered in fine silvery hairs called trichomes, and yellow-white flowers grow from stems at the top of the plant. The densely haired leaves are covered with white wax to help prevent drying. The plant has an extensive root system, which lends to its drought resistance. One taproot extends down, while lateral roots extend from the taproot to the side. In some plants, lateral roots are longer than the taproot while in other plants, the opposite is true. U.S. indigenous populations of guayule occur in the Trans Pecos region of southwestern Texas. It can also be found in the low desert regions of Arizona, New Mexico, and some parts of Southern California and the Mexican states of Zacatecas, Coahuila, Chihuahua, San Luis Potosí, Nuevo León, and Tamaulipas and is able to be cultivated in similar climates around the world.

== Breeding and production ==
Guayule breeding programs have been facilitated in order to domesticate, commercialize, and develop higher yielding cultivars. Selection of high-yielding guayule is complicated by its breeding system, which is primarily apomixis (asexual cloning via gametes). This breeding system is somewhat variable and considerable genetic variation exists within wild populations. Selection of high-yielding lines has been successful.

Parthenium argentatum is adapted for hot desert environments and grows well in well-drained, desert-like soil. It has been cultivated under both dryland and irrigated conditions. It can be grown in areas where annual rainfall ranges between 380 and 635 millimetres (15–25 in) and with temperatures rarely falling below −9 °C (16 °F). Due to the guayule plant's production of terpene resins, which are natural pesticides, it is resistant to many pests and diseases. Nonetheless, its slow growth from seed means herbicides are needed for stand establishment.

== History ==
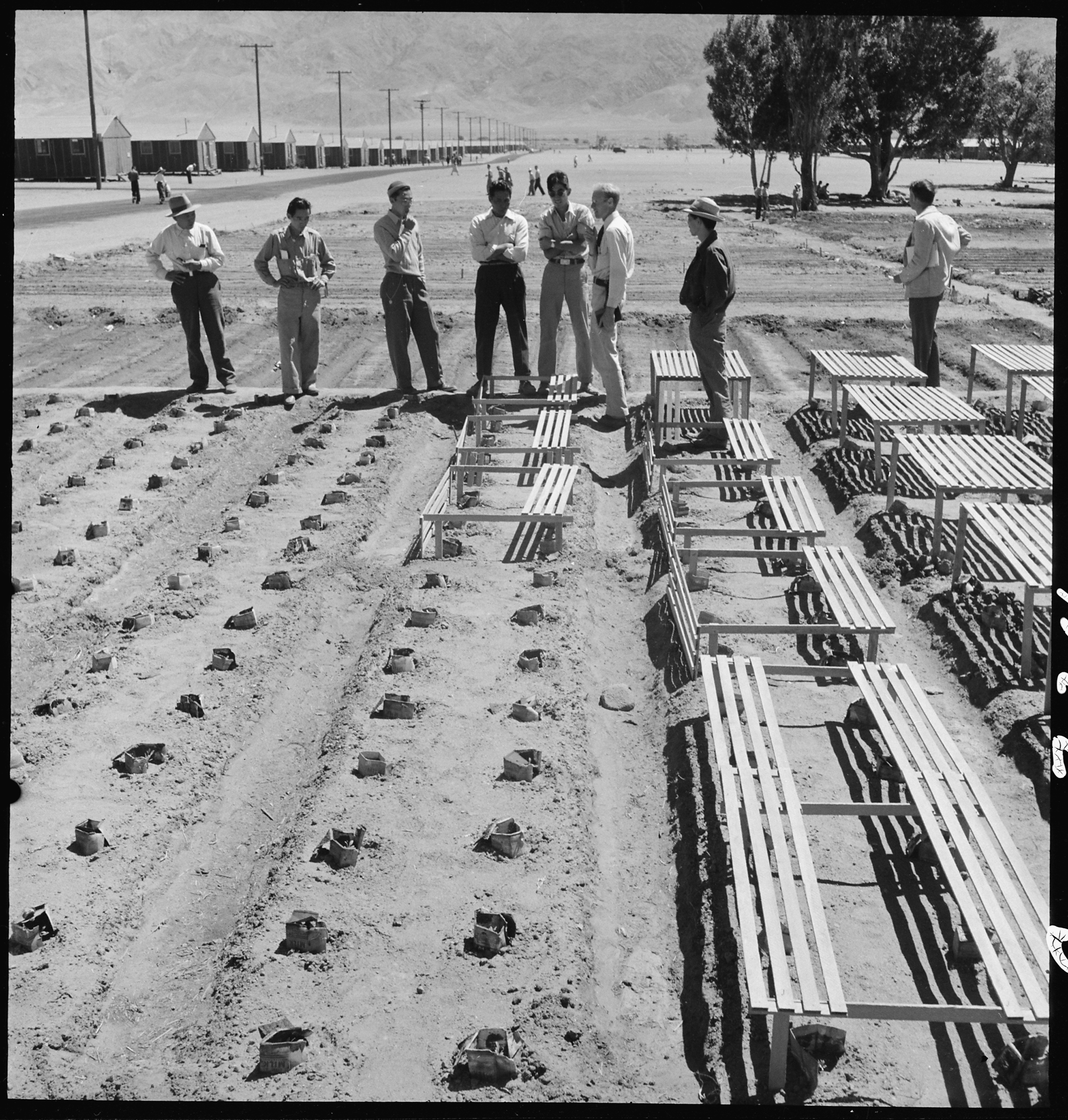
Dr. Robert Emerson (third from right), biochemist and botanist from the California Institute of Technology and director of the quayule rubber experiment, inspects young plants at Manzanar with his staff of internee scientists (June 29, 1942).

In the 1920s, the plant saw a brief and intense amount of agricultural research when the Intercontinental Rubber Company in California produced 1400 tons of rubber after South American Leaf Blight decimated the Brazilian rubber industry. Guayule would again become a replacement for Hevea tree-produced latex during World War II when Japan cut off America's Malaysian latex resources. The war ended before large-scale farming of the guayule plant began, and the project was scrapped, as it was cheaper to import tree-derived latex than to crush the shrubs for a smaller amount of latex.

Currently, PanAridus and Yulex are the only commercial producers of guayule natural rubber in the world. Yulex have partnered with Patagonia who are now making their Yulex wetsuit from Guayule derived plant stems in a 60/40 blend (60% guayule, 40% neoprene), reducing dependence on conventional neoprene.

In 2011, Howard Colvin led a successful $6.9 million DOE-funded Biomass R&D Initiative to produce and test an all-guayule tire.

In October 2015, the Bridgestone Corporation announced the creation of the first tires made entirely of guayule rubber, having built an experimental farm and biorubber research center in Mesa, Arizona the previous year. The guayule is grown in Mesa and Eloy, Arizona.

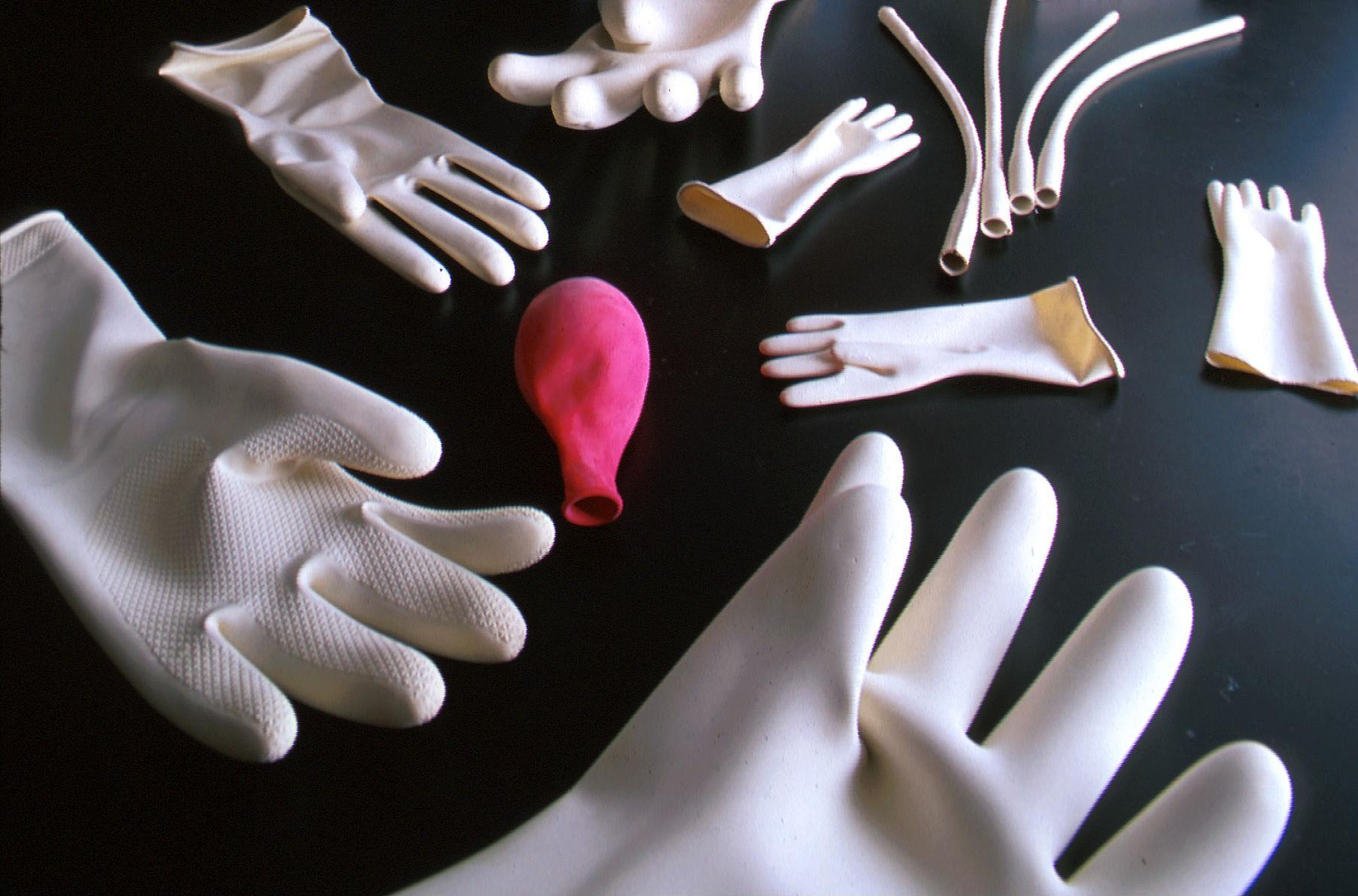
Experimental products made from guayule.

In 2022, IndyCar announced the use of eco-friendly guayule-derived rubber tires.

=== Hypoallergenic properties ===
In the 1980s, a surge of Type 1 latex allergy coincided with a world-wide increase in demand for latex gloves in response to heightened precautions to prevent the spread of diseases, such as AIDS and Hepatitis B. While Hevea-derived rubber contains proteins that can cause severe allergic reactions in some people, guayule does not. Although there are synthetic alternatives for medical device products, they are not as elastic as natural rubber. Guayule performs like Hevea but contains none of the proteins related to latex allergies. In 1997, a process to make hypoallergenic guayule latex was licensed by the U.S. Department of Agriculture to the Yulex Corporation.

== Biofuel ==
Guayule's viability as a potential biofuel has been enhanced recently in light of commentary from a variety of experts, including Lester R. Brown of the Earth Policy Institute, stating that "[food based] biofuels pit the 800 million people with cars against the 800 million people with hunger problems," meaning that biofuels derived from food crops (like maize) raise world food prices. Guayule can be an economically viable biofuel crop that does not increase the world's hunger problem. Guayule has another benefit over food crops as biofuel – it can be grown in areas where food crops struggle.

== See also ==
- Taraxacum kok-saghyz; the rubber dandelion, produces similar hypoallergenic rubber, even in cold climates
