= Howard Colvin (chemist) =

American organic chemist

Howard A. Colvin
- Education: University of Houston; Georgia Institute of Technology
- Known for: Guayule rubber development, thermoplastic polyolefins, rubber chemicals
- Awards: Melvin Mooney Distinguished Technology Award (2021)
- Scientific career
- Fields: Organic chemistry, Polymer science, Tire technology
- Workplaces: Goodyear Tire & Rubber Co., Solvay; Cooper Tire & Rubber Company; Florida College

Howard A. Colvin is an organic chemist and consultant to the tire and rubber industries noted for developments in rubber chemicals and polymers, and for his work funded by the federal Department of Energy on using guayule rubber in tires.

== Education ==
Colvin earned his Bachelor of Science in chemistry from the University of Houston in 1975. He completed a doctorate in chemistry at Georgia Institute of Technology in 1979.

== Career ==
Colvin began his career at Goodyear Tire & Rubber Co. in 1979 in the Chemical Division. In 2001, he joined Solvay Engineered Polymers, where he worked on thermoplastic polyolefins for automotive applications. In 2005 he joined Cooper Tire and Rubber Company working on tread compounds as an advanced chemist. From 2007 to 2011 he was a professor of chemistry at Florida College. He returned to Cooper in 2011 to lead a successful $6.9 million DOE-funded Biomass R&D Initiative grant to produce and test an all-guayule tire. Following his retirement from Cooper Tire in 2017, he has taken consulting roles with the USTMA, Silpara, Kengos, and Smithers.

== Awards ==
- 2021 — Melvin Mooney Distinguished Technology Award from ACS Rubber Division
