= David Benko =

American tire industry engineer

David A. Benko is a retired Goodyear chemist and materials R&D director.

== Education ==
Benko holds a PhD in physical organic chemistry from the University of Delaware. He completed his Bachelor of Science in chemistry from Union College.

== Career ==
Benko joined Goodyear in 1978. Before retiring as an R&D fellow, he was director of materials R&D at Goodyear. He has remained active as a consultant to the rubber industry.

Benko was the founding treasurer of the Tire Society, and he later served as president. He is on the editorial board of the Journal of Applied Polymer Science.

Benko's most cited work concerns the development of a bioprocess for isoprene monomer production. He is an inventor on at least 24 patents.

== Awards ==
- 1996 - Tire Society Distinguished Service Award
