= Edward Kresge =

American scientist (1935–2023)

Edward N. Kresge (July 31, 1935 – October 30, 2023) was an American Exxon scientist, noted for his development of ethylene-propylene viscosity index modifiers, polyolefin thermoplastic elastomers, and tailored molecular weight density EPDM elastomers.

== Life and career ==
Kresge was born on July 31, 1935. He earned his Ph.D. from the University of Florida.

Kresge joined Exxon in 1961, working under Francis P. Baldwin and later Albert M. Gessler. He retired from Exxon in 1993. His most cited work was a collaboration on the topic of copolymer compatibilizers with notable coworkers Sudhin Datta and David J. Lohse.

Kresge died on October 30, 2023, at the age of 88.

== Awards ==
- 1976 – National Inventors Hall of Fame Medal.
- 1993 – Arnold Smith Award from the ACS Rubber Division.
- 1995 – Melvin Mooney Distinguished Technology Award
- 1998 – Midgley award of the American Chemical Society for his role in the development of thermoplastic elastomer polyolefin blends for automobile bumpers
- 2010 – Charles Goodyear Medal of the Rubber Division of the American Chemical Society.
