= Melvin Mooney =

American physicist and rheologist

- Born: 1893; Kansas City, Missouri
- Died: 1968 (aged 74–75)
- Education: University of Chicago
- Known for: Mooney viscometer Mooney–Rivlin solid
- Awards: Charles Goodyear Medal (1962)
- Scientific career
- Fields: Polymer science
- Workplaces: United States Rubber Company

Melvin Mooney (1893–1968) was an American physicist and rheologist.

== Life ==
Mooney was born in Kansas City, Missouri. He achieved an A.B. degree from the University of Missouri in 1917 and a PhD in physics from the University of Chicago in 1923. He worked for the United States Rubber Company.

He developed the Mooney viscometer (used to measure viscosity of rubber compounds during curing) and other testing equipment used in the rubber industry. He also proposed the Mooney-Rivlin solid constitutive law describing the hyperelastic stress–strain behavior of rubber. He was the first recipient of the Bingham Medal from the Society of Rheology in 1948. He received the Charles Goodyear Medal in 1962. He is the namesake of the Melvin Mooney Distinguished Technology Award of the American Chemical Society Rubber Division.
