= Joseph Padovan =

American engineer

Joseph Padovan (14 April 1943 - ) is a retired University of Akron Distinguished Professor known for pioneering finite element procedures for analysis of rolling tires.

== Education ==
Padovan received his B.S. (1965), M.S. (1967) and Ph.D. (1969) degrees in Mechanical Engineering, all from the Polytechnic Institute of Brooklyn.

== Career ==
Padovan joined the University of Akron Mechanical Engineering faculty in 1970. He developed the first finite element procedures for the analysis of steady state rolling. These procedures are now widely used in the tire industry. He was an associate editor of the journal Tire Science and Technology for 36 years. In 2003, he famously was the last Tire Society speaker to present his work on an overhead projector.

== Awards ==
- 1986 - University Researcher of the Year, University of Akron.
- 1987 - Arch T. Colwell Merit Award, Society of Automotive Engineers.
- 1988 - Certificate of Recognition, NASA.
- 1990 - Best Paper Award, Tire Society.
- 2014 - Tire Technology International Lifetime Achievement Award
- 2018 - Melvin Mooney Distinguished Technology Award from Rubber Division of the ACS
