= Albert M. Gessler =

Research chemist

Albert M. Gessler (1919 – 18 May 2003) was an ExxonMobil research chemist known for the development of elastomeric thermoplastics.

== Personal ==
Gessler was a resident of Cranford, New Jersey for 58 years. He was active in civic life, founding Cranford's recycling program in 1971. He worked to establish Cranford's Conservation Center, chairing the Environmental Commission for several years. Gessler served as a leader in the Boy Scouts for more than 20 years. He received the Silver Beaver award in 1962. In 1999, the mayor of Cranford recognized Gessler's positive community impact with a resolution of Grateful Appreciation.

== Education ==
Gessler completed his Bachelor of Arts in chemistry at Cornell University in 1941.

== Career ==
Gessler began his career at Esso, joining in 1942. His most cited work is a 1959 patent on regarding a process for preparing a vulcanized blend of crystalline polypropylene and chlorinated butyl rubber. He was a mentor to Edward Kresge and coworker of William J. Sparks. He studied the chemical interaction between carbon black and various polymers. He served as chairman of the New York Rubber group in 1966. He was an organizer of the 1971 Gordon Conference on Elastomers. He is credited among the chief organizers of the popular text Science and Technology of Rubber. He was the 1986 recipient of the Melvin Mooney Distinguished Technology Award. At his retirement with 38 years of service, his title was senior research chemist.
