= Anke Blume =

German academic

Anke Blume (b. 6 April 1969) is an engineering technology professor at the University of Twente known for her contributions to silica and silane chemistry for rubber applications.

== Education ==
Anke Blume was born in Hanover, Germany, April 6, 1969. Blume studied chemistry at Leibniz University in Hannover, earning a master's degree in July 1993. She went on to complete doctoral studies at the German Institute for Rubber Technology (DIK), finishing in 1995 and continuing for a 9-month term as a post-doc.

== Career ==
Blume began an industrial career in 1996 as a chemist with the product development group at silica supplier Degussa AG (later to become Evonik). In 2011, she managed intellectual property for silica and silane in rubber applications.

Blume's academic career began when she joined the University of Twente in 2013, as Chair of Elastomer Technology and Engineering (ETE) Group. She has been noted for her contributions to rubber technology aimed at CO_{2} reduction, in particular for automotive lightweighting and for tire rolling resistance reduction. She was invited to a jury that judged Nokian Tyres sustainability innovation challenge. She also served on the panel that selected the Tire Technology International Awards for Innovation and Excellence. Blume was elected to serve as head of the German Rubber Society's western group, DKG West, for the term 2018–2021.

== Awards ==
- 2023 - Melvin Mooney Distinguished Technology Award from ACS Rubber Division
