= Eli M. Dannenberg =

American scientist (1917–1991)

- Born: 10 October 1917
- Died: 22 April 1991 (aged 73)
- Education: Massachusetts Institute of Technology
- Known for: Contributions to surface chemistry of carbon black
- Awards: Melvin Mooney Distinguished Technology Award
- Scientific career
- Workplaces: Cabot Corporation

Eli Mercer Dannenberg (10 October 1917–22 April 1991) was a Cabot scientist known for contributions to surface chemistry of carbon black.

== Education ==
Dannenberg completed his education at Massachusetts Institute of Technology in 1939.

== Career ==
A 1946 patent application for electrical insulation indicates that Dannenberg worked briefly for the Sprague Electric Company of North Adams, Massachusetts. He worked for Cabot in Boston as early as 1947 when he spoke at a meeting of the American Chemical Society on the topic of producing carbon black from coal. His earliest scientific work investigated the nature of the interface between carbon black and GR-S rubber via swelling measurements on vulcanized and unvulcanized carbon black filler rubber mixtures, concluding that "carbon black is associated with the rubber through van der Waals type adsorptive forces". His work at Cabot resulted in a number of patents and highly cited scientific papers in the period from 1956 to 1980. His most cited works concerned the surface chemistry of carbon black.

Dannenberg was the 1984 recipient of the Melvin Mooney Distinguished Technology Award from the ACS Rubber Division.

Dannenberg retired to Longboat Key, Fla. but continued to consult in the carbon black and rubber industries.
