= J. Roger Beatty =

American engineer (1917–2010)

James Roger Beatty (April 9, 1917-November 25, 2010) was a B. F. Goodrich Senior Research Fellow and the first recipient of the Melvin Mooney Distinguished Technology Award.

== Early life and education ==
Beatty was born in Iola, Kansas on April 9, 1917. His birth certificate recorded the birthday erroneously as 9 March. His mother died when he was 14 years old. He obtained a Physics degree from Kansas State University. He served in the U.S. Cavalry, Fort Riley, from which he received an honorable discharge in 1936.

== Career ==
Beatty moved to Akron, Ohio in 1942 to join B. F. Goodrich, working under Arthur E. Juve. He remained with the company until his retirement in 1982 as a senior research fellow.

Beatty was a prolific inventor and author of scientific papers on rubber technology. His patents included testing devices / methods for measuring cure behavior, ozone cracking, rubber tack and cutting and chipping resistance of rubber. He chaired the 1974 Gordon Research Conference on Elastomers.

== Awards and recognitions ==
- 1979 - certificate of special appreciation from the ACS Rubber Division for service as chairman of the program planning committee.
- 1982 - Inaugural recipient of the Melvin Mooney Distinguished Technology Award from the ACS Rubber Division
