= Gerard Kraus =

Czech-American scientist (1920–1990)

Gerard Kraus (February 25, 1920 – 1990) was a Czech-born American scientist. He was a Phillips Petroleum scientist known for developing testing standards for carbon black surface area.

== Education ==
Kraus was born in Prague, Czechoslovakia, the son of a pathologist and professor of medicine. He came to the United States in 1940, following his graduation in 1938 from the State High School in Prague. In 1943, he completed his Bachelor of Science degree with High Honors from Southern Methodist University. He presented work entitled "Supercharging Diesels" at the ASME convention that year. In 1947, he received the doctoral degree in polymer chemistry working under W. B. Reynolds at the University of Cincinnati, under a fellowship funded by the Inland Division of General Motors Corporation. He studied adhesion of rubber-to-metal interfaces with application to the manufacture of tank track treads.

== Career ==
From 1947 to 1953, Kraus was employed on the faculty at the University of Cincinnati, first as an instructor, then later as an assistant professor. He joined the Research and Development department at Phillips Petroleum Company in 1953. By 1963, he was managing a group responsible for exploratory work in carbon black, filler reinforcement, and properties of elastomers. In 1968 his title was Senior Scientist.

Kraus' most cited work is an account of the swelling behavior of filler-reinforced, vulcanized rubbers. He established a relationship on the assumption that, at the filler interface, swelling is completely restricted due to adhesion. He is also known for a model of the Payne effect.

== Awards ==
- 1990 – Melvin Mooney Distinguished Technology Award
- 1996 – elected to the International Rubber Science Hall of Fame
