= Francis P. Baldwin =

Scientist

Francis Paul Baldwin (November 23, 1915 — August 17, 1993) was a former Exxon Chief Scientist noted for his work on chemical modifications of low functionality elastomers.

== Personal ==
Baldwin was born on November 23, 1915, in Brooklyn, Kings County, New York, United States. He married Helen Koelbl on Nov. 27, 1943. They lived in Summit, New Jersey, for many years. He died August 17, 1993, in Coupeville, Island County, Washington, US. He went by the nickname 'Baldy'.

== Education ==
Baldwin received his Bachelor of Science degree in physics from Wagner Memorial Lutheran College in 1941. He received a doctorate from the University of Notre Dame in 1953.

== Career ==
Baldwin joined Exxon in 1937. Seeking to compatibilize butyl rubber with natural rubber, together with Robert M. Thomas, he found that gaseous chlorination of butyl leads to degradation. This result caused them to switch to a solution-based chlorination process. This process was commercialized in 1960. He supervised the work of 2010 Goodyear medalist Edward Kresge. In 1975 he retired from Exxon as Chief Scientist, the highest title in the chemical technology department. At his retirement, he held 60 U.S. patents in the field of limited functionality rubbers: chlorobutyl, butyl rubber, and Ethylene propylene rubber.

== Awards and recognitions ==
- 1979: Charles Goodyear Medal from the ACS Rubber Division
