= Yulex =

Arizona agricultural products company

Yulex Corporation
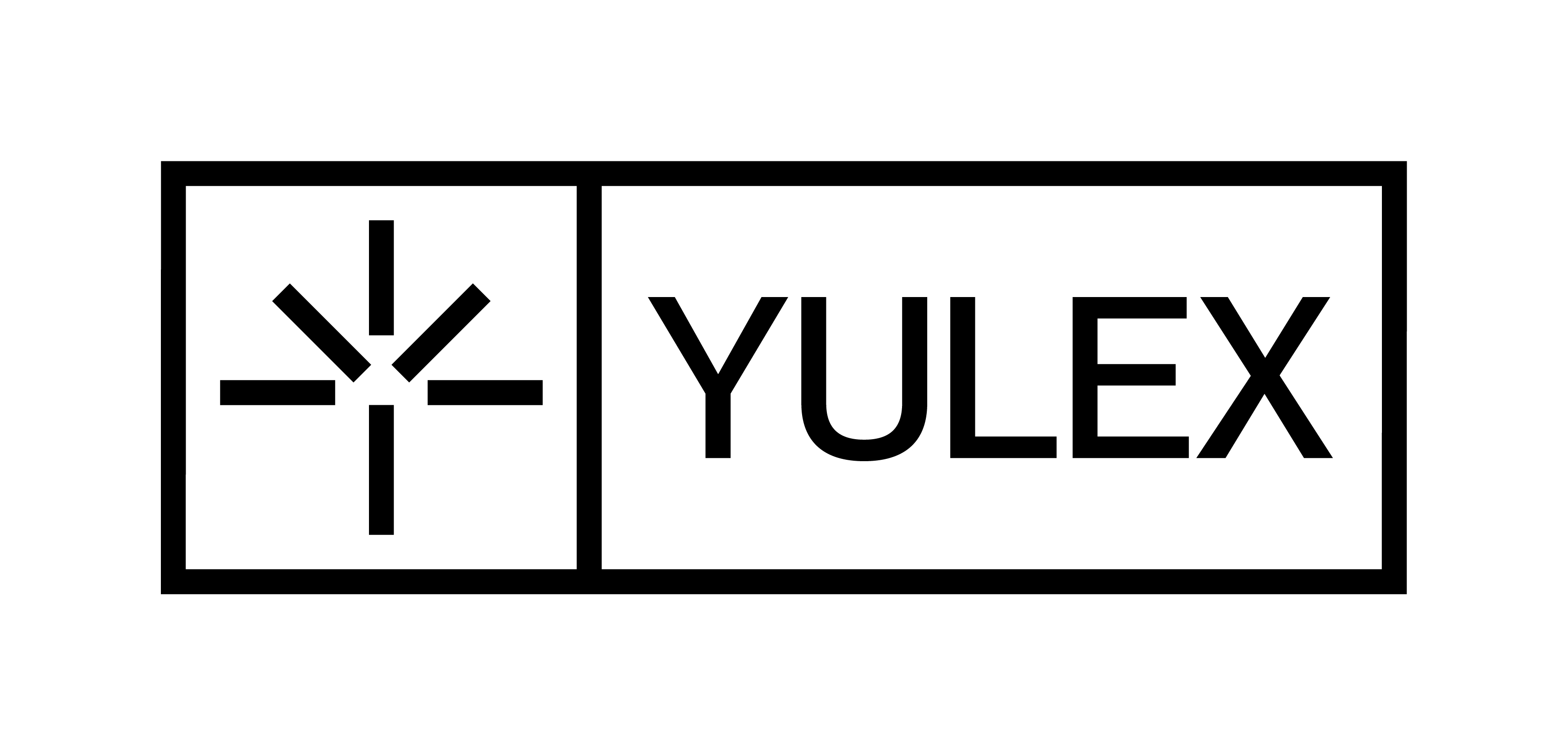
- Company type: Private Corporation
- Industry: Rubber
- Founded: 2000
- Founder: Daniel R. Swiger, Jeffery A. Martin
- Headquarters: Chandler, Arizona, U.S.
- Area served: Worldwide
- Key people: Jeffrey A. Martin (Director, President and CEO) Stephen James Mitchell (Chief Technology & Operations Officer)
- Products: Biorubber Emulsions, Biorubber Solids, Biomass
- Website: www.yulex.com

Yulex Corporation makes products from Guayule (Parthenium argentatum) a residual agricultural material.

== History ==
In 2008, the U.S. Food and Drug Administration (FDA) approved Yulex biorubber gloves for medical uses. Yulex is the first company to produce biobased, medical-grade latex that is safe for people with latex allergy.

In 2012, Yulex received a $6.9 million USDA-DoE grant as part of a research consortium. Partnering with the Agricultural Research Service (ARS) and Cooper Tire, Yulex will research enhanced manufacturing processes, testing and utilization of guayule natural rubber as a strategic source of raw material in tires, and evaluate the remaining biomass of the guayule plant as a source of bio-fuel for the transportation industry, as well work on improving agronomic practices, developing genetic information and undertaking a lifecycle analysis.

Also in 2012, Yulex released the first alternative to the traditional neoprene wetsuit in partnership with Patagonia, the first guayule-based mattresses and pillows in partnership with Pure LatexBliss, and the first plant-based, latex allergy-friendly dental dam in partnership with 4D Rubber.

In 2013, Yulex formed a partnership with ENI's Versalis to expand the reach of guayule into European markets.

== See also ==
- Parthenium argentatum
- Rubber
