= Deformation index =

Parameter used in engineering

The deformation index is a parameter that specifies the mode of control under which time-varying deformation or loading processes occur in a solid. It is useful for evaluating the interaction of elastic stiffness with viscoelastic or fatigue behavior.

If deformation is maintained constant while load is varied, the process is said to be deformation controlled. Similarly, if load is held constant while deformation is varied, the process is said to be load controlled. Between the extremes of deformation and load control, there is a spectrum of intermediate modes of control, including energy control.

For example, between two rubber compounds with the same viscoelastic behavior but different stiffness, which compound is preferred for a given application? In a strain controlled application, the lower stiffness rubber would operate at smaller stress and therefore produce less viscous heating. But in a stress controlled application, the higher stiffness rubber would operate at small strains, thereby producing less viscous heating. In an energy controlled application, the two compounds might give the same amount of viscous heating. The right selection for minimizing viscous heating therefore depends on the mode of control.

== Definition ==
Futamura's deformation index $n$ can be defined as follows. $p$ is the parameter whose value is controlled (i.e., held constant). $E$ is Young's modulus of linear elasticity. $\epsilon$ is the strain. $\sigma$ is the stress.

$$p= \epsilon E^{ \frac{n}{2}}= \sigma E^{ \frac{n}{2}-1}$$

Particular choices of $n$ yield particular modes of control and determine the units of $p$. For $n=0$, we get strain control: $p= \epsilon = \sigma E^{ -1}$. For $n=1$, we get energy control: $w = \frac{1}{2} p^2 = \frac{1}{2} \epsilon^2 E= \frac{1}{2} \sigma^2 E^{ -1}$. For $n=2$, we get stress control: $p= \epsilon E= \sigma$.

== History ==
The parameter was originally proposed by Shingo Futamura, who won the Melvin Mooney Distinguished Technology Award in recognition of this development. Futamura was concerned with predicting how changes in viscoelastic dissipation were affected by changes in compound stiffness. Later, he extended applicability of the approach to simplify finite element calculations of the coupling of thermal and mechanical behavior in a tire. William Mars adapted Futamura's concept for application in fatigue analysis.

== Analogy to polytropic process ==
Given that the deformation index may be written in a similar algebraic form, it may be said that the deformation index is in a certain sense analogous to the polytropic index for a polytropic process.
