= Daniel L. Hertz Jr. =

American industry executive (1930–2021)

Daniel L. Hertz Jr. (February 27, 1930 - January 9, 2021) was an entrepreneur, executive and self-educated scientist noted for his leadership in the rubber industry.

== Personal ==
Hertz was born to Daniel L. Hertz Sr. and Elizabeth Beet Hertz in Montclair, New Jersey, on February 27, 1930. He married Isabel P. Waud. He served in the Korean War in the Army.

== Education ==
Hertz attended Stevens Institute of Technology, studying mechanical engineering, but he was asked to leave after his freshman year. He was later award an honorary degree, of which he said "that honorary degree came like a shot out of the blue... that kept me alive for years, it really did. After I was kicked out of Stevens, I thought if I ever showed up on campus I'd be lynched."

== Career ==
He worked for a time as a salesman for Precision Rubber Products, and for a distribution company named Linear. At the age of 23, Hertz founded Seals Eastern Inc to design and manufacture o-rings. In 1986, following the Space Shuttle Challenger disaster, NASA consulted with Hertz, and he appeared as an expert on the MacNeil-Leher Newshour and other media. He had particular expertise in nitrile rubber for oil and gas applications.

== Awards ==
- 1982 - honorary degree in Mechanical Engineering from Stephens Institute of Technology
- 2006 - Melvin Mooney Distinguished Technology Award from Rubber Division of the ACS
- 2007 - Executive of the Year, Rubber and Plastics News
- 2015 - Raymond Hopp Lifetime Achievement Award for Excellence in New Jersey Manufacturing
