= Kenneth T. Gillen =

Kenneth T. Gillen is a retired Sandia National Labs researcher noted for contributions to service life prediction methods for elastomers

== Education ==
Gillen completed his PhD in chemistry at University of Wisconsin - Madison in 1970 under advisor Joseph H. Noggle.

== Career ==
Gillen joined Sandia National Labs in 1974, working on elastomeric seals in nuclear weapons and satellites. His research has focused on the prediction of the service life of polymers under exposure to temperature, radiation, humidity and mechanical stress. His most highly cited published work was the development of testing and analysis methods for the combined effects of diffusion and oxidation in polymers. His methods overcame limitations of earlier, less accurate methods based on the Arrhenius equation. His development of a technique for profiling of oxidation-induced stiffness gradients in aged elastomers was applied in the tire industry.

Gillen served as an editor of the Elsevier journal Polymer Degradation and Stability from 1999 to 2006.

He retired from Sandia in 2004 but continued in a part time consulting role until 2015.

== Awards ==
- 2020 - Melvin Mooney Distinguished Technology Award from Rubber Division of the ACS
