= Robert P. Lattimer =

American chemist (1945–2025)

Robert Phillips Lattimer (February 2, 1945 – October 12, 2025) was an American chemist who worked for Lubrizol as an Advanced Materials research and development technical fellow. He was an advocate for including intelligent design in public science curriculum.

== Early life and education ==
Lattimer was born in Missouri on February 2, 1945. He attended the University of Missouri where he earned a B.S. in chemistry. Lattimer obtained his doctoral degree in 1971 in physical/analytical chemistry from the University of Kansas.

== Career ==
Lattimer worked for B.F. Goodrich and later Noveon and Lubrizol as a research chemist. He retired as a Senior Technical Fellow following nearly 40 years of service. His published work on mass spectrometry and polymer characterization and degradation have been widely cited. He was a Vice-President of the American Society for Mass Spectrometry. Lattimer was Vice-Chairman of the 1985 Gordon Research Conference on Analytical Pyrolysis. His most cited work treated the subject of mass spectrometry of transition metal macrocycles.

== Political Advocacy ==
Lattimer was a board member for the Eagle Forum of Ohio. He advocated for pro-family issues in the state, and was the Science Issues Chairman. He advocated for including Intelligent Design in the Ohio Board of Education's state science curriculum. Lattimer was a founder of the advocacy group Science Excellence for All Ohioans (SEAO). He co-authored a book titled The Evolution Controversy.

== Death ==
Lattimer died in Akron, Ohio, on October 12, 2025, at the age of 80.

== Awards and recognition ==
- 1990 - Sparks–Thomas award
- 2008 - Melvin Mooney Distinguished Technology Award from the ACS Rubber Division
- He was a recipient of an Eagle Award from Eagle Forum and a Wedge of Truth Award from IDnet.
