= Anil K. Bhowmick =

Indian polymer scientist

- Born: 1954 (age 71–72)
- Education: IIT Kharagpur
- Occupations: Professor; Researcher; Director

Anil K. Bhowmick (born 1954) is a University of Houston professor known for contributions to polymer nanocomposites, thermoplastic elastomers, sustainability, adhesion, failure and degradation of rubbers and rubber technology.

== Early life and education ==
Bhowmick was born in 1954 in Kolkata, India. He earned his Bachelor of Science degree from St. Xavier's College, Kolkata in 1974. He completed his master's degree (M.Sc.) in 1976, and his doctoral (Ph.D.) degree in 1980 under advisor S. K. De at the Indian Institute of Technology, Kharagpur. His doctoral thesis treated the topic of vulcanization at high temperature. He worked briefly at Dunlop India Ltd. before taking a postdoctoral position at the Institute of Polymer Science, at the University of Akron from 1981 to 1984.

== Career ==
Bhowmick returned to IIT Kharagpur as an assistant professor in 1984. He achieved the rank of full professor in 1988. He headed the rubber technology program during two periods: 1990-1991 and 2005–2007. In 2009, he was named a professor of eminence at IIT Kharagpur. He was a visiting scholar at the London School of Polymer Technology in 1987 and at the Tokyo Institute of Technology in 1991–1992. He was head of the Rubber Technology Centre during 1990-91 and 2005–2007, and dean of sponsored research and industrial consultancy during 2000–2003 at IIT Kharagpur. He was named a professor of eminence at the Indian Institute of Technology, Kharagpur in 2009. He was the director of the Indian Institute of Technology, Patna until joining the University of Houston in 2019.

Bhowmick co-authored with University of Akron professor Howard L. Stephens the popular text Handbook of elastomers.

Bhowmick reported what is possibly the most complete set of measurements of the fatigue threshold for a number of elastomers.

== Awards ==
- 1997 winner of the George Stafford Whitby award of the Rubber Division, American Chemical Society
- 2002 winner of the Chemistry of Thermoplastic Elastomers award of the Rubber Division, American Chemical Society
- 2019 - Fred Schwab Education Award of the Society of Plastics Engineers
- 2022 - Melvin Mooney Distinguished Technology Award from ACS Rubber Division
