= Avrom I. Medalia =

Scientist

Avrom Izak Medalia (3 February 1923 – 20 June 2002) was a Cabot scientist known for contributions to understanding electrical conductivity and dynamic properties of carbon black filled rubbers

== Education ==
Medalia was a graduate of the Boston Latin School. In 1942, he received the A.B. degree in chemistry from Harvard University. He then studied synthetic rubber and emulsion polymerization under I. M. Kalthoff at the University of Minnesota, receiving a Ph.D. in analytical chemistry in 1948.

== Career ==
Medalia's first post-academic position was with the Brookhaven National Laboratory from 1949 to 1952. He was associate director of sponsored research at Boston University from 1952 to 1955. He started at Cabot in 1956 and continued there until his retirement in 1984. At Cabot, he held various positions in research and management.

His most cited work concerned the effect of carbon black on the dynamic properties of rubber, in particular the Payne effect. He also did highly influential work on the electrical conductivity of carbon black filled rubber.

In 1978, he was awarded the Gold Medal of the Plastics and Rubber Institute. He was the 1987 recipient of the Melvin Mooney Distinguished Technology Award.
