= Sudhin Datta =

Polymer scientist and engineer

Sudhin Datta (born 1951) is an ExxonMobil Chemical scientist noted for the development of Vistamaxx propylene-based elastomers.

== Education ==
Datta earned his undergraduate degree in chemistry from Indian Institute of Technology at Kanpur in 1974. He completed his Ph.D. in organometallic chemistry from Harvard University in 1978. He held postdoctoral appointments at the University of Toronto and at the University of Chicago.

== Career ==
In 1981, he joined Exxon Chemical Co. under Edward Kresge where his research focused on the development of polyolefin elastomers. With David J. Lohse, he published the textbook Polymeric Compatibilizers.

== Awards ==
- 2015 – Charles Goodyear Medal of the Rubber Division of the American Chemical Society
