= Benjamin S. Garvey =

Dr. Benjamin St. John Garvey (1900–1973) was a chemist at BF Goodrich who worked under Waldo L. Semon on the development of synthetic rubber, contributed to understanding of vulcanization, and developed early techniques for small scale evaluation of rubbers. In particular, he was the inventor of the Garvey die for evaluating the extrusion quality of rubber compounds.

Garvey was born in Cambridge, Massachusetts. He obtained his BS in chemistry at University of Illinois 1921, taught chemistry at Episcopalian Boone University in Wuchang China for 3 years, then returned to complete his MS in 1925 under Roger Adams. He completed his PhD in organic chemistry under James Bryant Conant at Harvard and then joined BF Goodrich in 1927.

In 1958, Garvey was chairman of the ACS Rubber Division.

Garvey was the 1965 recipient of the Charles Goodyear Medal. He received the ASTM D11 Award of Merit in 1966.
