= Mooney viscometer =

Rubber compound testing instrument

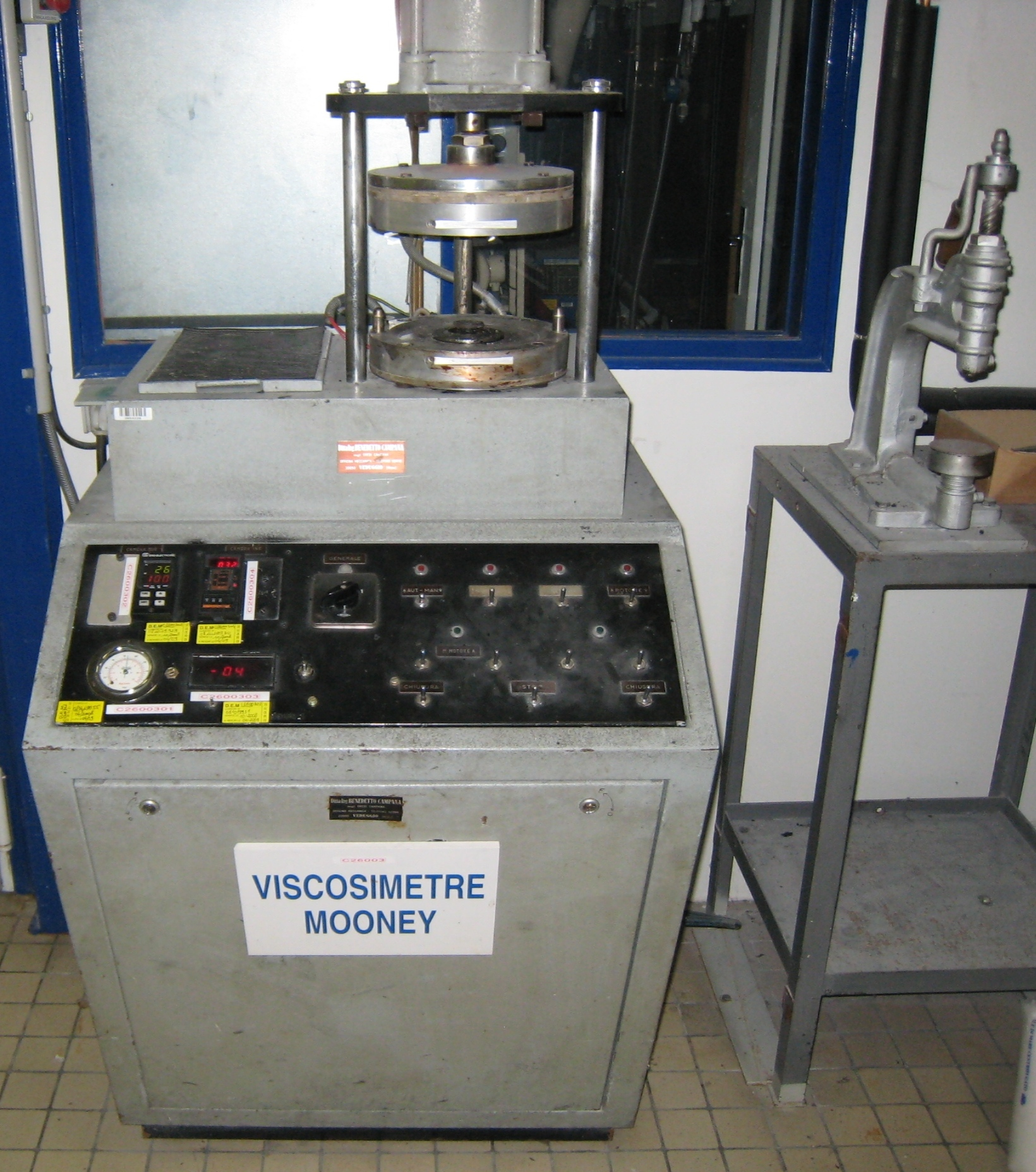
A Mooney viscometer

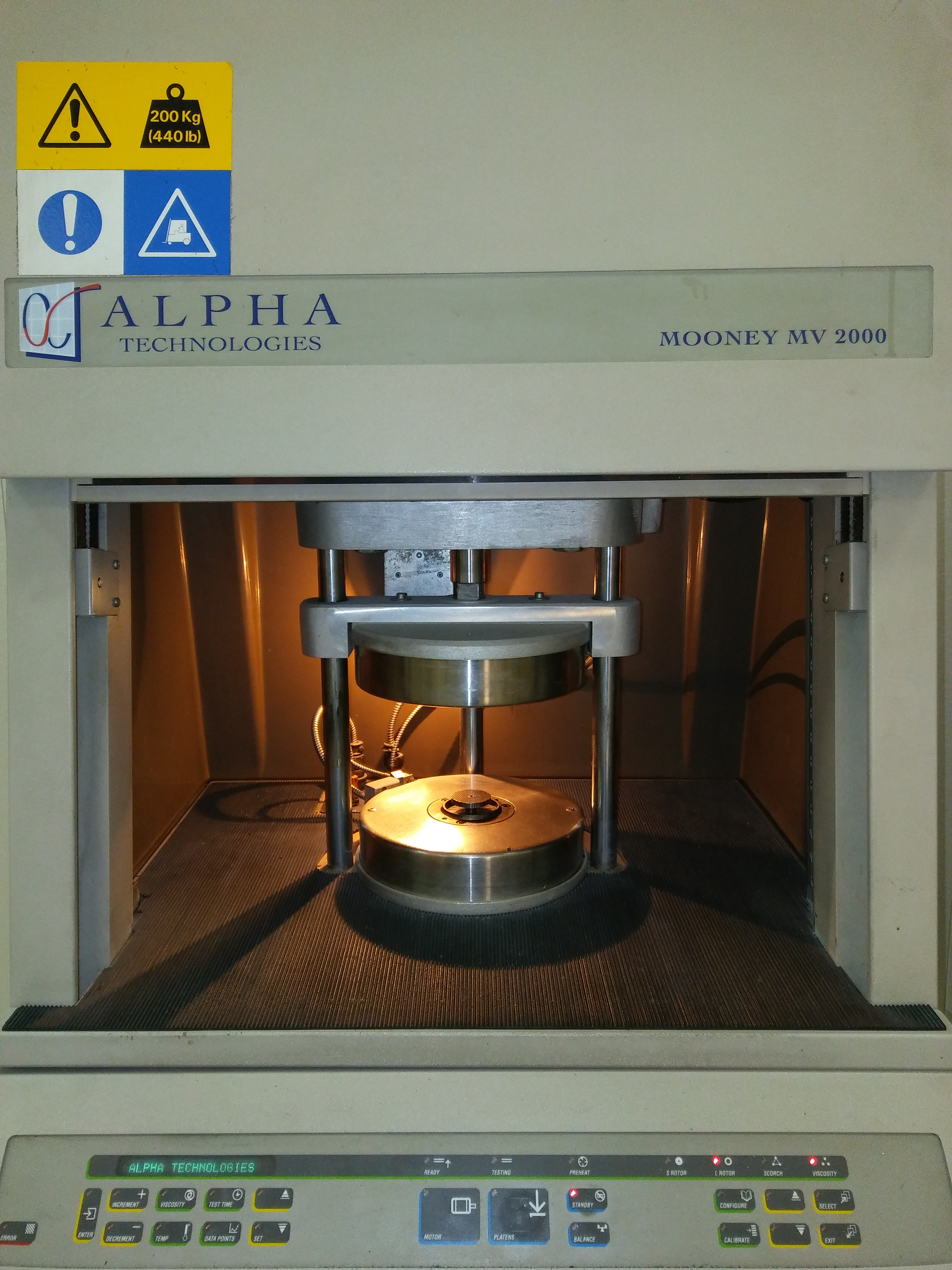
MV 2000 Mooney Viscometer

A Mooney viscometer or rotating disk viscometer is an instrument used for measuring the Mooney viscosity of rubbers. Invented in the 1930s by Melvin Mooney, it contains a rotating spindle and heated dies, the substance encloses and overflows the spindle and the mooney viscosity is calculated from the torque on the spindle.

== Instrument description ==
The working principle of the Mooney viscometer consists in the measurement of the torque necessary to rotate a disc in a cylindrical chamber filled with the rubber compound to be vulcanized. A number proportional with the value of this torque is taken as viscosity index (Mooney viscosity) and is reported in arbitrary Mooney units.

The rubber compound is introduced under pressure into the test chamber, made up of two halves. Inside the test chamber a disc is rotated by means of a motor. To avoid rubber slippage during the determination, both the chamber walls and the rotor surface are striated.

The conversion of the torque into viscosity units is made by means of a calibrated flat spring anchored to the rotating disc shaft. The deformations of the shaft are transmitted to the indicating scale. The elasticity of the spring is chosen so that to a torque of 84 daN.cm correspond 100 viscosity units. The chamber is electrically heated and the temperature is kept constant within 0.5 degree C.

== Test procedure ==
The rubber compound, including the vulcanizing system, is shaped on the mill as 6–8 mm thick sheets. Round-shaped samples with 45 mm diameter are cut from the sheets. The samples are pierced in the middle in order to allow the rotor shaft to pass. Before the beginning of the measurement, the instrument is heated up to 118 degree C. After the sample is introduced, it takes a minute for the sample to reach the thermal equilibrium, and then the rotor is started.

The value of Mooney viscosity decreases at the beginning, due to the decrease of the compound viscosity as temperature rises. After about 4 min, a minimum value is reached, which stays constant for a while. This value is indicated as MV. After a certain period of time, vulcanization starts and the Mooney viscosity increases.

The following values are indicated on the obtained curve:

minimum viscosity MV;
scorch time (t5) - the time interval (measured from rotor start) corresponding to a viscosity increase of 5 Mooney units over MV, measured at rotor start. The t5 value indicates the prevulcanization tendency of the compound. The larger t5 is, the lower the prevulcanization tendency, and, therefore, the rubber compound can be more reliably processed on mill, calender or extruder.
Vulcanization time (t35) - the time interval (measured from rotor start) corresponding to a viscosity increase of 35 units over the MV value.
Vulcanization index - Dt30 = t35 − t5; provides indications about the vulcanizing ability of a rubber compound. A compound with a low vulcanization index, cures more rapidly than a compound with a higher vulcanization index.

Optimum vulcanization time at the experimental temperature employed (top), which can be calculated with the relationship:

top = (t5 − tMV) + 10.Delta 30

where tMV is the time interval, measured from rotor start until Mooney viscosity reaches the MV value.

By using the slope of the curve, the vulcanization rate can be determined.

If vulcanization goes on, Mooney viscosity becomes in many cases practically constant in time. Going beyond the plateau time leads to either reversion in natural rubber, or overcure in synthetic elastomers.
