= Samuel Kelly Clark =

American professor

Samuel Kelly Clark (3 November 1924– 26 October 2006) was a professor in the Department of Engineering Mechanics at the University of Michigan who was known for contributions to the science of tires. His 1971 monograph Mechanics of Pneumatic Tires was considered by many in the tire industry to be its most important engineering text.

== Education ==
Clark was born and raised in Ypsilanti, Michigan, where he graduated from Roosevelt High School, which was associated with Michigan Normal College. In 1942, he joined the U.S. Navy's V-12 Program. He was commissioned as a Lieutenant. After World War II he joined Douglas Aircraft Company as an engineer and later the Ford Motor Company in Dearborn. He completed his doctoral degree in engineering from the University of Michigan in 1952.

== Career ==
Clark's first academic appointment was as an assistant professor of mechanical engineering at Case Western Reserve University. However, in 1955, he returned to the University of Michigan in the Department of Engineering Mechanics. He continued here until his retirement in 1994 at the rank of tenured professor.

He founded the Precision Measurement Company in 1966. Precision Measurement developed sensor technology that was used in tire testing.

== Awards ==
- 1985 – Fellow of the Society of Automotive Engineers
- 2009 (post-humous) – Tire Society Distinguished Achievement Award
