= Rubber Chemistry and Technology =

- Discipline: Materials science
- Language: English
- Edited by: Christopher G. Robertson

Publication details
- History: 1928–present
- Publisher: American Chemical Society Rubber Division (United States)
- Frequency: Quarterly
- Impact factor: 2.081 (2021)

Standard abbreviations
- ISO 4: Rubber Chem. Technol.

Indexing
- CODEN: RCTEA4
- ISSN: 0035-9475
- LCCN: 30008948
- OCLC no.: 1764630

Links
- Journal homepage; Online access and archive

Rubber Chemistry and Technology is a quarterly peer-reviewed scientific journal covering fundamental research and technical developments relating to chemistry, materials science, and engineering of rubber, elastomers, and related materials. It was established in 1928, with Carroll C. Davis as its first editor-in-chief. The current editor-in-chief is Christopher G. Robertson. The journal is published by the ACS Rubber Division. The journal currently publishes four issues per year containing original research contributions and review articles.

== Abstracting and indexing ==
The journal is abstracted indexed in:

- Chemical Abstracts Service
- Chemistry Server Reaction Center
- Compendex
- Current Contents/Engineering, Computing & Technology
- Current Contents/Physical, Chemical & Earth Sciences
- Inspec
- Polymer Library
- Reaction Citation Index
- Science Citation Index
- Scopus

According to the Journal Citation Reports, the journal has a 2021 impact factor of 2.081.

== Past editors ==
The following persons have been editors-in-chief of the journal:

- Christopher G. Robertson (Polymer Technology Services; July 2020-present)
- William V. Mars, (Endurica; 2010-June 2020)
- Krishna Baranwal (Akron Rubber Development Lab; 2002-2009)
- Frederick Ignatz-Hoover, (Monsanto; 2000-2001)
- C. Michael Roland (U.S. Naval Research Laboratory; 1991-1999)
- Gary Hamed (University of Akron; 1984-1990)
- Aubert Y. Coran (Monsanto; 1978-1983)
- Karl Frensdorff (E. I. du Pont de Nemours; 1975-1977)
- Earl C. Gregg (B. F. Goodrich; 1969-1974)
- Edward Bevilacqua (U.S. Rubber, Wayne Research Center; 1965-1968)
- David Craig, (B. F. Goodrich; 1957-1964)
- Carroll C. Davis (Boston Woven Hose Co.; 1928-1956)
