= German Institute for Rubber Technology =

German rubber industry research institute

Deutsches Institut für Kautschuktechnologie e. V.
- German Institute for Rubber Technology
- Deutsches Institut für Kautschuktechnologie e. V.
- Abbreviation: DIK
- Formation: 1981; 45 years ago
- Legal status: Research center
- Purpose: Rubber research and development
- Headquarters: Eupener Strasse 33
- Location: Hanover, Germany
- Coordinates: 52.3462°N 9.7866°E
- Region served: Worldwide
- Methods: Research, publication
- Head: Ulrich Giese
- Staff: 55 (2010)
- Website: www.dikautschuk.de/en/

The German Institute for Rubber Technology. is a publicly funded nonprofit organization, based in Hanover Germany, whose purpose is the advancement of applied research in rubber technology. The mission includes both the chemical and physical behavior of rubber, and the reduction to practice of applications. It has been noted for producing many of the scientists working in the German rubber industry. It has been noted for its leadership in the tire industry on the topic of tire wear particles in the environment.

== History ==
The institute was founded in 1981 on the initiative of the German rubber industry and the Lower Saxony Ministry of Economics, Labor, and Transport (ADK) with Dr. Gottfried Pampus as its initial director. The founding of the institute occurred during a period of expansion in Germany of 3rd party funding by means of institutionalized collaboration between academia and private industry. In 2004, a 1.5 million Euro expansion was made to add seminar rooms and a library. In 2010, a 3.6 Million Euro floor space expansion was opened. It is a founding member of the European Research & Rubber Laboratories (ERRLAB) initiative. In 2011, it established a Rubber Excellence Partnership with Lanxess and Qingdao University of Science and Technology. It organizes a Fall Rubber Colloquium annually

== Notable researchers ==
- Anke Blume
- Ulrich Giese - director of DIK from 2010–present
- Manfred Klüppel
- Robert Schuster - director of DIK from 1992 to 2010
