= Arthur E. Juve =

Arthur Edgar Juve (1901–1965) was a B. F. Goodrich Director of Technology who developed oil-resistant rubber compositions, lab tests for tire treads, and improvements in manufacture of rubber products and the processing of synthetic rubber.

== Education ==
Juve obtained his BS in chemical engineering from Ohio State University in 1925.

== Career ==
By Jan 1926, Juve was employed at BF Goodrich in Ravenna, Ohio. He was a supervisor of J. Roger Beatty.

Juve held patents for halogenated rubber cements (1944), synthetic rubber offset printing blankets (1942), rubber rollers resistant to printing ink (1942), and the viscurometer, a specialized rheometer for rubber compounds undergoing crosslinking (1965). His most cited scientific publication studied vulcanization accelerator TMTD.

While director of technical services at BF Goodrich's Brecksville research center, Juve served as chairman of the ACS Rubber Division.

== Awards and Recognitions ==
- 1964 - Charles Goodyear Medal from the ACS Rubber Division
