= Goodrich Corporation =

Defunct American manufacturer

- Formerly: Goodrich, Tew & Co.; B.F. Goodrich Company; BFGoodrich
- Type: Public
- Traded as: NYSE: GR
- Industry: Aerospace
- Founded: 1870; 156 years ago Akron, Ohio U.S.
- Founder: Benjamin F. Goodrich
- Defunct: July 26, 2012; 14 years ago
- Fate: Acquired by United Technologies Corporation; Tire division sold to Michelin
- Headquarters: Charlotte, North Carolina, United States
- Key people: Marshall Larsen (chairman & CEO)
- Products: Actuation systems; Aerostructures; Aircraft wheels and brakes; Electrical power systems; Engine components; Engine control systems; Engineered Polymer Products; Interiors; ISR systems; Undercarriage/landing gear; Sensors and integrated systems
- Website: www.goodrich.com [checked 21Jun2025- no longer valid; no forwarding]

The Goodrich Corporation was an American manufacturing company. Founded in Akron, Ohio, in 1870 as Goodrich, Tew & Co. by Benjamin F. Goodrich, the company name was changed to B.F. Goodrich Company in 1880, to BFGoodrich in the 1980s, and lastly to Goodrich Corporation in 2001. From 1999 until its acquisition in 2012, the company was headquartered in Charlotte, North Carolina.

Originally a rubber manufacturing company known for automobile tires, the company diversified its manufacturing businesses throughout the twentieth century and sold off its tire business in 1986 to focus on its other businesses, such as aerospace and chemical manufacturing. The BFGoodrich brand name continues to be used by Michelin, who acquired the tire manufacturing business in 1988. Following the acquisition by United Technologies in 2012, Goodrich became a part of UTC Aerospace Systems.

== History ==
Goodrich dealer's decorated car in Salt Lake City c. 1913

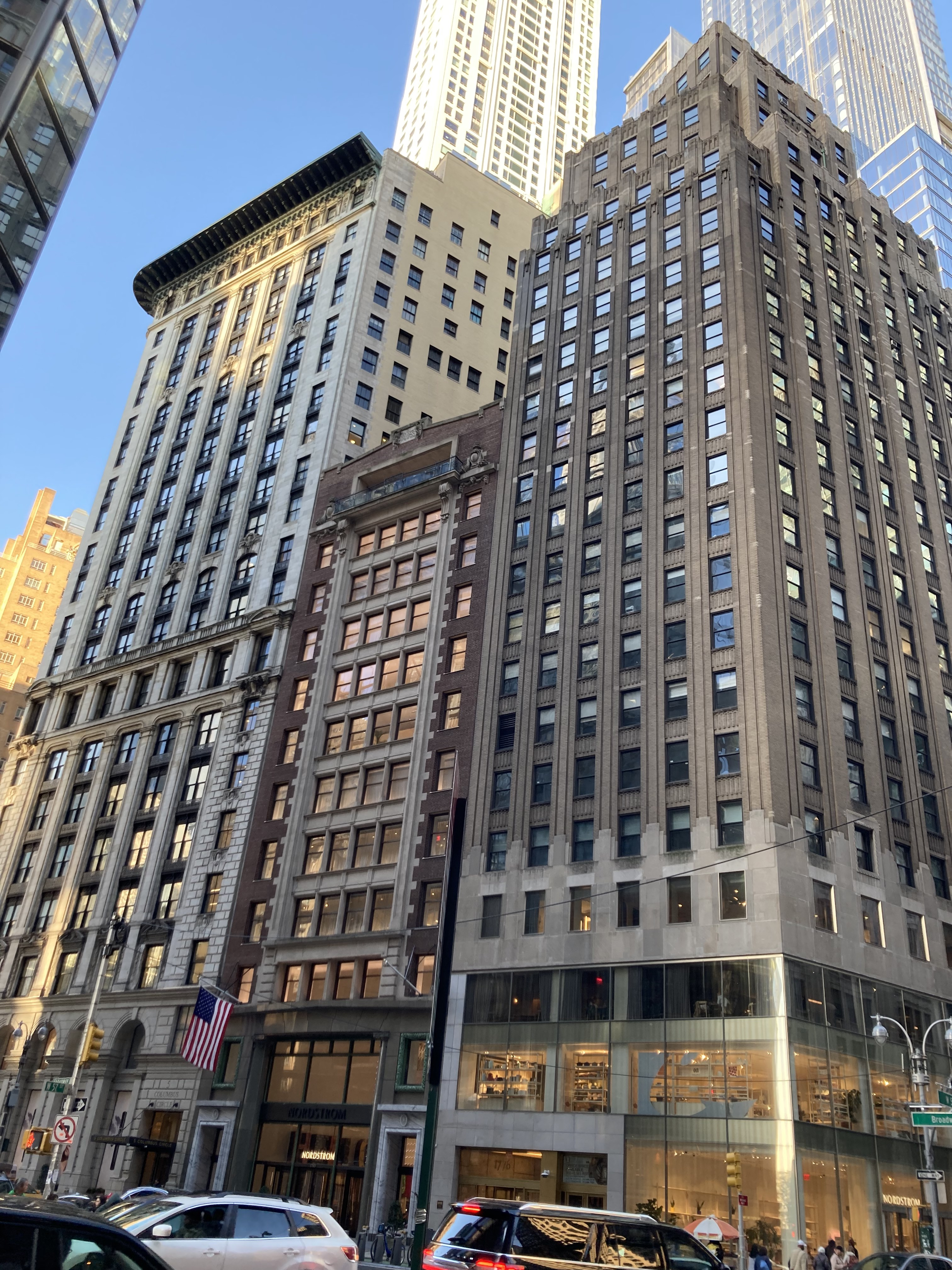
The 12-story historical building of B.F. Goodrich Corporation of New York (center)

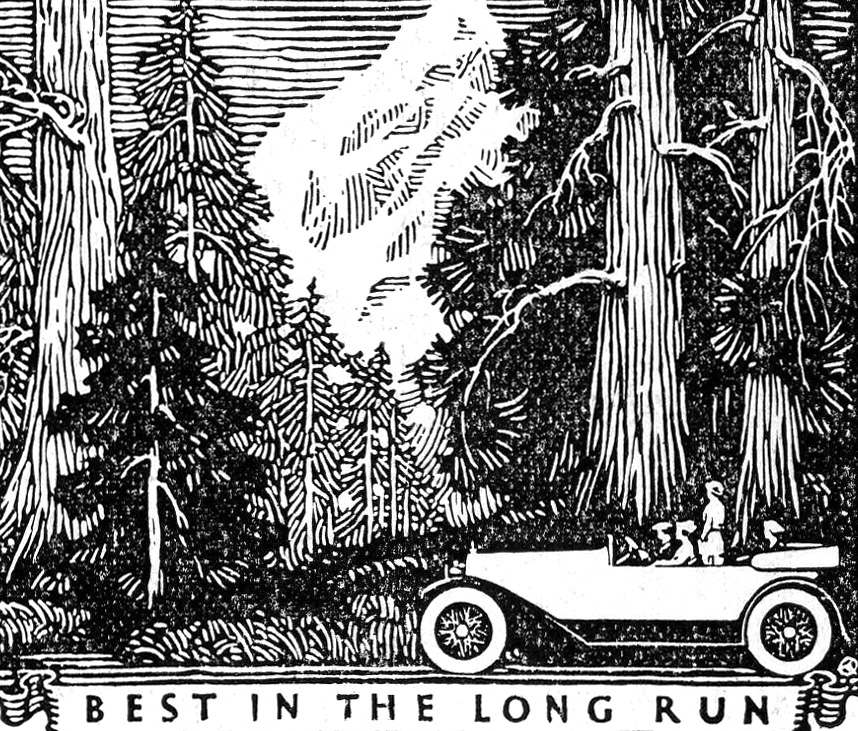
1920 advertisement for Goodrich Silvertown Tires

=== Early history ===
In 1869 Dr. Benjamin Franklin Goodrich purchased the Hudson River Rubber Company, a small business in Hastings-on-Hudson, New York. The following year Goodrich accepted an offer of $13,600 from the citizens of Akron, Ohio, to relocate his business there. In 1909, the company constructed a 12-story building with a facade influenced by Jacobean Revival style and Vienna Secession for its New York headquarters located at 1780 Broadway, New York. It is now one of the city's historical landmarks.

In March 1912, the Diamond Rubber Company, founded by the owner of the Diamond Match Company, was bought out by and merged with the B.F. Goodrich Company. The Diamond brand name and product line were retained and a subsidiary Diamond Rubber Company created for the marketing and manufacturing of them. The company helped found and start the Yokohama Rubber Company on October 13, 1917, in a joint venture between Yokohama Cable Manufacturing and B.F. Goodrich.

B.F. Goodrich sold radios from the 1930s to the 1950s, under the brand name "Mantola". These radios were actually made by a variety of manufacturers for B.F. Goodrich. In 1936, the company entered the Mexican market in a joint venture, Goodrich-Euzkadi (now part of Continental AG). Goodrich ranked 67th among United States corporations in the value of World War II military production contracts.

The Troy, Ohio plant was purchased in 1946 from Waco. Since then, Goodrich has manufactured wheels and brakes for a variety of aircraft. Among these are commercial, military, regional, and business programs. This successful operation lies at the core of Goodrich's business. Competitors include the aerostructures divisions of companies such as Honeywell, Messier-Bugatti, Aircraft Braking Systems, (Howmet/Huck) and SNECMA. The Hood Rubber Company was sold before the Great Depression as a division of the B.F. Goodrich Company.

During the 1970s, Goodrich ran television and print ads to distinguish themselves from the similar-sounding Goodyear tire company. The tag line was, "We're the other guys. Remember?" The company was also sometimes confused with Mr. Goodwrench as the two last names were similar, especially since B.F. Goodrich tires were featured on many General Motors cars and trucks.

=== 1980–1990s acquisitions ===
By 1986, B.F. Goodrich had become an S&P 500-listed company in diverse business, including tire and rubber fabrication. B.F. Goodrich made high-performance replacement tires. In August 1986, one of its biggest competitors in the tire business, Uniroyal Inc., was taken private when it merged with the tire segment of the B.F. Goodrich Company, in a joint venture private partnership, to become the Uniroyal Goodrich Tire Company. B.F. Goodrich Company held a 50% stake in the new tire company.

The new Uniroyal Goodrich Tire Company headquarters was established at the former B.F. Goodrich corporate headquarters, within its 27-building downtown complex in Akron, Ohio which contained Goodrich's original factory. In the autumn of 1987 B.F. Goodrich Company shut down several manufacturing operations at the site, and most of the complex remained vacant until February 1988, when B.F. Goodrich announced plans to sell the vacant part of the complex to the Covington Capital Corporation, a group of New York developers. The complex is now known as Canal Place.

In 1987, its first full year of operation, the new Uniroyal Goodrich Tire Company generated almost $2 billion in sales revenue, with profits of $35 million. The merger soon proved to be difficult. In June 1988 B.F. Goodrich sold its 50% stake for $225 million. The buyers were a group of investors led by Clayton, Dubilier & Rice a private New York investment firm. At the same time, B.F. Goodrich also received a warrant to purchase indirectly up to 7% of the equity in Uniroyal Goodrich Tire Company.

As part of the June 1988 sale deal, the new privately held tire company acquired publicly held debt of $415 million.

Also in 1988, Michelin Group, a subsidiary of the French tire company Michelin et Cie proposed to acquire the Uniroyal Goodrich Tire Company and took actions towards acquiring a stake. By May 1990, Michelin Group had completed its buyout of Uniroyal Goodrich Tire Company from Clayton & Dubilier of New York. The deal was valued at about US$1.5 billion. B.F. Goodrich surrendered its 7% warrant to Michelin Group, and received $32.5 million additional revenue from the sale.

=== Leaving the tire business ===
B.F. Goodrich by then exited the tire business entirely, in line with its plan to build its chemicals and aerospace businesses through reinvestment and acquisitions. In 1997, it acquired Rohr, a maker of jet aircraft engine nacelles, expanding its presence in integrated aircraft components industry.

In 1999, it acquired Charlotte, North Carolina–based Coltec Industries for $2.2 billion in stock and assumed debt, making the former tire maker the No. 1 supplier of landing gear and other aircraft parts. Headquarters were moved to Charlotte following this merger. In 2001, the company divested its specialty chemicals business to focus on aerospace and industrial products and, to signify the completion of its transformation, it was renamed Goodrich Corporation and adopted a new logo. In October 2002, Goodrich acquired TRW Aeronautical Systems, this division was mainly the former Lucas Aerospace activity, mostly based in the UK and France.

In 2006, company sales were $5.8 billion, of which 18%, 16% and 12% of total revenues were accounted for by the U.S. government, Airbus and Boeing, respectively.

=== Fate ===
In September 2011, United Technologies Corporation announced a deal to buy Goodrich for $18.4 billion, paying $127.50 per share and assuming $1.9 billion in debt.

On July 26, 2012, United Technologies Corporation purchased Goodrich. Unsold divisions of Hamilton Sundstrand and Goodrich were then merged to create UTC Aerospace Systems. Rocketdyne, Hamilton Sundstrand's industrial pumps and compressors operations, Clipper Windpower, and UTC Power (United Technologies' fuel-cell business) would be sold off to raise cash for the deal.

On October 16, 2012, United Technologies Corporation secured an agreement to sell the Power Systems division of Goodrich (Twinsburg Ohio, Pitstone Green Buckinghamshire) to Safran for $400 million. The sale of this business unit was a condition that the Chinese competition regulators set in approving UTC's purchase of Goodrich. The Power Systems division had to be divested by December 16, 2012. Ultimately, the sale was completed on March 27, 2013.

In April 2020, the remaining portions of Goodrich became part of the Collins Aerospace subsidiary of Raytheon Technologies, a firm which resulted from the merger of United Technologies and the Raytheon Company. Raytheon Technologies is now known as RTX Corporation.

== Technologies ==
=== Actuation and landing systems ===
- Actuation systems
- Aircraft wheels and brakes
- Aviation technical services
- Landing gear
- Engine components

=== Electronic systems ===
- Sensors and Integrated systems
- Engine control and electrical power systems
- ISR (intelligence, surveillance, and reconnaissance) systems

and

=== Nacelles and interior systems ===
- Aerostructures
- Interiors
- Customer services

== Platforms ==
B.F. Goodrich Tires logo; the Goodrich Corporation sold off its automotive tire division to Michelin in 1988.

=== Civil ===
- AgustaWestland AW139 helicopter (electronic ice protection system)
- Airbus A320 series
- Airbus A330/A340
- Airbus A350XWB
- Airbus A380
- Boeing 737
- Boeing 747-400
- Boeing 757-200
- Boeing 767
- Boeing 777
- Boeing 787
- Bombardier Global Express
- Canadair Regional Jet
- Cessna Citation
- Bombardier Dash-8 Q400
- Embraer 170
- Embraer 190
- Handley Page Jetstream
- Lear Jet
- Piaggio P180

=== Military ===
- A-6 Intruder
- Airbus A400M (Electrical power generation, flaps, transmission ice detection sensors)
- B-52 Stratofortress
- CH-46 Sea Knight (wheels or rotor brakes)
- C-141 Starlifter
- C-5 Galaxy
- CH-47 Chinook (wheels or rotor brakes)
- CH-53 Sea Stallion (wheels or rotor brakes)
- Embraer KC-390
- F-14 Tomcat
- F-15 Eagle (radome erosion boot)
- F-16 Fighting Falcon (nosewheel)
- F-117 Nighthawk
- F-111 Aardvark
- Harrier jump jet – all versions (hydromechanical fuel systems)
- P-3 Orion
- Panavia Tornado – all versions (engine controls, high lift control unit, flap and slat actuation, nozzle control)
- S-3 Viking
- SEPECAT Jaguar – all versions (hydromechanical fuel systems)
- Space Shuttles (wheels and brakes; tire business sold to Michelin in 1988)
- SR-71 Blackbird
- V-22 Osprey (wheels or rotor brakes)

== Restatements ==
On February 24, 2004, Goodrich restated its fourth-quarter and full-year earnings results for 2003 after Pratt & Whitney notified the company that it was drastically cutting its order for engine casing components.

== Notable employees ==
- Benjamin S. Garvey – worked for B.F. Goodrich and Pennsalt Chemicals Corporation. Dr. Garvey developed the "10 Gram Evaluation Process."
- William C. Geer – pioneer in studying rubber ageing, and developer of early aircraft de-icing systems, vice-president at BFGoodrich
- David Grylls, Chula Vista, California, Olympic Silver Medal Winning Cyclist
- Frank Herzegh, inventor of the tubeless tire
- Samuel E. Horne Jr. – Goodrich chemist who first polymerized synthetic polyisoprene using Ziegler catalyst
- Arthur E. Juve – BFGoodrich Director of Technology who developed oil-resistant rubber compositions, lab tests for tire treads, and improvements in manufacture of rubber products and the processing of synthetic rubber
- Virgil A. Martin, Los Angeles, California, City Council member (1927–31)
- George Oenslager – chemist known for pioneering vulcanization accelerator chemistry
- John D. Ong, CEO (1979-1996) and U.S. Ambassador to Norway (2002-2005)
- Waldo L. Semon – early developer of synthetic rubber, in particular Ameripol for BFGoodrich.
