= Tire Science and Technology =

Academic journal published by the Tire Society

- Discipline: Engineering
- Language: English
- Edited by: Michael Kaliske

Publication details
- History: 1973-present
- Publisher: The Tire Society (United States)
- Frequency: Quarterly
- Impact factor: 1.0 (2021)

Standard abbreviations
- ISO 4: Tire Sci. Technol.

Indexing
- CODEN: TSTCA
- ISSN: 0090-8657
- LCCN: 2008212884
- OCLC no.: 465361276

Links
- Journal homepage

Tire Science and Technology is a quarterly peer-reviewed scientific journal that publishes original research and reviews on experimental, analytical, and computational aspects of tires. Since 1978, the Tire Society has published the journal. The current editor-in-chief is Michael Kaliske (Dresden University of Technology).

== History ==
The journal was founded in 1973 and was originally published by a committee of the American Society for Testing and Materials until 1977, when the Tire Society was incorporated for the purpose of continuing the journal.

== Content ==
Topics of interest to journal readers include adhesion, aerospace, aging, agriculture, automotive, composite materials, constitutive modeling, contact mechanics, cord mechanics, curing, design theories, durability, elastomers, finite element analysis, force and moment behavior, groove wander, heat build up, hydroplaning, impact, manufacturing, mechanics, military, noise, pavement, performance evaluation, racing, rolling resistance, snow and ice, soil, standing waves, stiffness, strength, traction, vehicle dynamics, vibration, and wear.

== Past Editors ==
- 1977 –1982: Dan Livingston (Goodyear Tire and Rubber Company)
- 1983 – 1994: Raouf Ridha (Goodyear Tire and Rubber Company)
- 1995 – 1999: Jozef DeEskinazi (Continental)
- 2000 – 2007: Farhad Tabaddor (Michelin)
- 2008 – 2009: William V. Mars (Cooper Tire)
- 2010 – present: Michael Kaliske (TU Dresden)
