= Thermoplastic vulcanizates =

Part of the thermoplastic elastomer family of polymers

Thermoplastic vulcanizates (TPVs) are a type of thermoplastic elastomers (TPE) that undergo vulcanization processes during manufacturing, giving elastomeric properties to the final product. Vulcanization involves the cross-linking of polymer chains, leading to increased strength, durability, and flexibility. Their thermoplastic nature allows TPVs, unlike traditional vulcanized rubbers, to be melted and reprocessed multiple times. Across the automotive, household appliance, electrical, construction, and healthcare sectors, nearly 100 TPV grades are used globally.

Monsanto trademarked the name Santoprene for these materials in 1977. The trademark is now owned by the Celanese Corporation. Similar material is available from Elastron, and others.

== Overview ==
Thermoplastic vulcanizates were first reported in 1962 by A.M. Gessler and W.H. Haslett. In 1973, W.K. Fisher reported the dynamic vulcanization process through his prior work on polypropylene and EPDM rubber-based TPVs with peroxides as a cross-linking agent. This resulted in the commercialization of "Uniroyal TPR" thermoplastic rubber. TPVs are a blend between a thermoplastic matrix and vulcanized rubber - combining the properties of both. A combination of elastomeric properties, including compressibility, tension sets, aging performance, and chemical resistance, characterizes TPVs. Although TPVs are part of the TPE family of polymers, they behave closer to EPDM thermoset rubbers in terms of their elastomeric properties.

The first sales of developmental products began in 1977, the same year TPV was registered as Santoprene by Monsanto, and it was fully commercialized in 1981.

== Early successes ==
Santoprene TPV had early application successes in the automotive sector, including rack and pinion boots. This was motivated by its flex life, fluid resistance, and sealability. In the appliance sector, a dishwasher sump boot was developed where Santoprene TPV provided sealing and resistance to heat and fluids. Santoprene TPV was also successful in the domestic and high-rise construction sectors in applications such as window seals, caster wheels, tubing, small hose parts, electrical connectors, and coatings for wires and cables. It was also used in the medical industry for gaskets on syringe plungers.

== Chemistry ==
Santoprene TPV is a dynamically vulcanized polymer alloy consisting mostly of fully cured EPDM rubber particles encapsulated in a polypropylene (PP) matrix.

Photographs made using atomic force microscopy and scanning electron microscopy show a multitude of very small particles, typically no bigger than a few microns in diameter. These particles are fully vulcanized rubber (typically EPDM rubber for most Santoprene TPV grades) in a thermoplastic phase (most often PP in the case of Santoprene TPV grades). Fully cross-linked or vulcanized means 98% or above, and because the morphology is "locked-in," it provides stable physical properties.

== Properties ==
The properties of thermoplastic vulcanizates include:

- Hardness: The typical range is between 30 and 90 Shore A or higher, depending on the formulation.
- Tensile strength: Usually between 5 and 20 MPa, varying by specific blend and processing conditions.
- Elongation at break: Stretchable up to 3 times its length (300%).
- Compression set: The range is 10 to 30%, reflecting a major recovery after deformation.
- Thermal stability: Service temperature ranges is –40 °C to 120 °C (-40 °F to 248 °F), depending on formulation.
- Chemical resistance: Resistant to oils, solvents, and many chemicals; varies with formulation.
- Water absorption: Often less than 1% after 24 hours of immersion.
- Flammability: Often self-extinguishing; can vary based on specific additives.
- Processing capability: Can be processed using standard thermoplastic processing methods, such as injection molding and extrusion. Coprocessing with other polymers can include coextrusion, molding, and blow molding for multipart system designs.
- Recyclability: Can be reprocessed and recycled.
- Density: This can be reduced through design optimization and material replacement.
- Sealing performance: Long-term durability combined with dimensional stability and physical properties over the life of the part.
- Color: Black

== Applications ==
Commercial TPV grades can be designed for a broad range of specific engineering applications, with grades ranging from hardness of 35 Shore A to 50 Shore D.

=== Automotive components ===
Thermoplastic vulcanization is used commercially for weather seals as a lightweight alternative to thermoset rubber materials in semi-dynamic and static parts. In under-hood and under-vehicle applications, it is well-suited for air ducts, tubing, molded seals, grommets, suspension bellows, cable jacketing, plugs, bumpers, and many other parts, thanks to its sealing performance and resistance to extreme temperatures, chemical exposure, and harsh environments.

=== Building and construction products ===
In commercial glazing seals, TPV can be used for curtain walls, storefronts, architectural windows, and skylight weather-seal applications. It is also commonly used for residential glazing seals because of its low air- and water-infiltration ratings for the life of window and door systems.

Other applications include bridge decks, parking decks, water stops, rail pads, road construction projects and rail construction projects. TPV can be used to make durable seals, gaskets, and grommets that are resistant to flex fatigue, harsh temperatures, and chemicals, as well as for a variety of sealing applications, including pipe seals, bridge expansion joints and curtain walls, parts for potable water, and pipe seals for sewer and drainage.

=== Household appliance parts ===
Some TPV is used commercially in washing machines, dryers, dishwashers, refrigerators, small appliances, and floor care. Other uses include parts such as pump seals, hoses, couplings, vibration dampeners, drum rollers, knobs, and controls.

=== Electrical components ===
Commercial TPV is used in wiring connectors to make watertight seals with electrical and thermal resistance, insulation for high voltage applications, and parts requiring the use of temperatures down to −60 °C. For applications requiring watertight seals, TPV enables connectors to be insert-molded to cable jacketing, producing a single integral part.

It is also used for industrial wire and cable connectors and low-voltage industrial cable applications that include insulation and jackets, in addition to consumer wire and cable use.

== Processing ==
After a short drying period, TPV pellets are automatically transferred to the molding machine or extrusion line. Cycle times can be significantly faster compared with rubber (2 to 3 minutes) because the parts do not have to cure in the mold. Once the TPV parts are allowed to cool (about 30 seconds), they can be removed from the mold.

Some commercial TPVs can be processed using conventional thermoplastic processes, such as injection molding, blow molding, and extrusion. The manufacture of TPV parts is less complex in contrast to rubber. Some commercial TPVs are ready to use and do not need to be compounded with other ingredients, such as reinforcing fillers (carbon black, mineral fillers), stabilizers, plasticizing oils, and curing systems.

Compared to processing rubber, thermoplastic processing of TPV can deliver shorter cycle times, higher parts output per hour, and the reuse of scrap produced during processing. These attributes can result in cost reduction, less tooling/machinery, lower scrap costs, and optimization of material logistic costs compared to rubber.

=== Processing options ===
Injection molding: TPV can be processed using conventional thermoplastics injection-molding equipment at reduced cycle times compared to thermoset rubber. This flexibility allows for greater freedom of mold design where undercuts are employed.

Insert molding: This method consists of placing a preformed substrate into the mold and injecting TPV around or over it. If the insert and the TPV are compatible materials, a melt bond occurs at the interface between the two materials. The strength of this bond is affected by several factors, including interface temperature, cleanliness of the insert, and the TPV's melt temperature.

Two-shot injection molding: TPV can be combined with other polymers through several multi-shot injection molding processes. By combining multiple materials, a wide variety of parts applications, such as a hard/soft combination, can be achieved. The process produces both a finished part and a substrate during each cycle. Two-shot molding is more efficient than insert molding because no substrate handling is required

Blow molding: Santoprene TPV can be blow molded in a single-layer, multi-layer, exchange blow, sequential 3D, suction blow, flashless extrusion blow, injection blow, and press-blow molding process.

Extrusion: TPV easily extrudes into single and complex profiles. These materials can also be coextruded to yield a part with both rigid and soft components.

Thermoforming: The thermoforming properties of TPV are similar to those of acrylonitrile butadiene styrene (ABS) rubber and exhibit good melt strength, which provides uniform and predictable sag characteristics during heating. When producing a sheet for thermoformed parts, key attributes of some commercial TPV can be maintained, including colorability, impact resistance, weather ability, chemical resistance, and non-skid, and matte surface in appearance and feel.

== Recycling ==
The use of some commercial TPV can contribute to a reduction in overall waste in the manufacturing process, as scrap produced during processing can be recycled. Material that has been recycled – even from old parts – exhibits properties almost as good as virgin material, according to a 2013 publication.

== Recyclability advantages ==
One of the most significant benefits of TPVs is their potential for recycling. Unlike traditional thermoset rubbers, thermoplastic vulcanizates can be:

- Reprocessed multiple times
- Recycled into new products
- Used in closed-loop manufacturing systems, and
- Blended with virgin material for new applications.

According to the article:

- The results of tests on protective boots for an automotive rack and pinion gears showed that older TPV has slightly poorer physical and mechanical properties than new material. Some of the key indicators of the material's ability to maintain its properties did not change significantly. For example, new and old TPVs had nearly the same properties after air and oil ageing. The compression set also remained virtually identical.
- The results of tests that measured the color shift (Delta E) between the exterior and interior surfaces of old and new automotive secondary roof profiles showed that the TPV material experienced insignificant color changes. Other tests, which looked at whether the surfaces of the profiles bore the marks of radiation-induced degradation, showed a homogeneous appearance.
- In tests that compared old and new automotive glass run channel profiles, there was no significant difference in the tensile stress-strain properties—a key indicator of sealing performance.
