= List of inductees in the International Rubber Science Hall of Fame =

The International Rubber Science Hall of Fame recognizes the careers of notable professionals in rubber technology. It is jointly sponsored by the Maurice Morton Institute of Polymer Science at The University of Akron and the Rubber Division of the American Chemical Society.

The Goodyear Polymer Center at the University of Akron houses the Hall of Fame's portrait gallery.

== Inductees ==
The following are members of the International Rubber Hall of Fame:

- Norman Bekkedahl
- Walter Bock
- Wallace Carothers
- Peter Debye
- John Boyd Dunlop
- John D. Ferry
- Paul Flory
- Charles Goodyear
- Charles Greville Williams
- Thomas Hancock
- William Draper Harkins
- Carl Harries
- Samuel E. Horne, Jr.
- Frederick Kipping
- Gerard Kraus
- Werner Kuhn
- Herman Francis Mark
- Melvin Mooney
- Maurice Morton
- Leonard Mullins
- Giulio Natta
- George Oenslager
- Ivan Ostromislensky
- Joseph C. Patrick
- Henry Nicholas Ridley
- Ronald Rivlin
- Adolf Schallamach
- William J. Sparks
- Hermann Staudinger
- Michael Szwarc
- David Tabor
- Robert M. Thomas
- Robert William Thomson
- William A. Tilden
- L. R. G. Treloar
- George S. Whitby
- Karl Ziegler

== See also ==
- Charles Goodyear Medal: Another ACS rubber award
- Melvin Mooney Distinguished Technology Award: Another ACS rubber award
- International Rubber Science Hall of Fame: Another ACS award
- Rubber Chemistry and Technology: An ACS journal
- List of chemistry awards
