= Frank Herzegh =

Frank Herzegh (April 11, 1907 – December 4, 1989) invented the first successful tubeless tire.

Herzegh was born in Cleveland, Ohio, graduating from West Technical High School in 1926. Collegiately, he attended Case School of Applied Science, now known as Case Western Reserve University, receiving his bachelor's degree in physics in 1930. He played college football for the Case Tech, notably scoring the game winning touchdown in 1927 at Luna Park against rival Western Reserve Red Cats for the 7–6 victory; Case Tech would not win again against their rival until 1948.

Herzegh joined the B.F. Goodrich Corporation, Akron, Ohio as a research and development engineer immediately after graduating Case Tech. In 1946, he applied for his tubeless tire patent and eventually received US patent 2587470 in 1952 in the United States. In addition to his famous tubeless tire invention, he investigated tire vibrations, tire traction and he created 100 other patents during his lifetime. After a 42-year career with Goodrich, he retired in 1972.

In 1978, he was awarded the Charles Goodyear Medal, the highest honor conferred by the American Chemical Society, Rubber Division.

== Personal life ==
In 1938, he married Eleanor Pitkin Owen; together, they had 3 children.

He lived a majority of his adult life in Shaker Heights, Ohio, where he was cremated.
