= Nissim Calderon (scientist) =

Polymer scientists and engineer

Nissim Calderon (Hebrew: ניסים קלדרון; 1 April 1933 – 24 February 2020) was a Goodyear executive and scientist, noted for his introduction of olefin metathesis in 1967. His work on olefin metathesis led to the 2005 Nobel Prize in Chemistry.

== Education ==
Calderon earned his MS in Chemistry from Hebrew University in 1958. In 1962, he completed his PhD in Polymer science at the University of Akron.

== Personal ==
Calderon was born in Jerusalem on 1 April 1933, the son of Jacob and Rina (Behar) Calderon. Calderon married Rivka Rapoport on July 26, 1961. They had two children.

== Career ==
Calderon joined Goodyear Tire and Rubber Company in 1962. In 1967, he was promoted to Section Head of Elastomers Research Division. In 1983, he became manager of tire materials research. In 1998, he retired as Vice President. Dr. Calderon held this position as an officer of the company for twelve years until his retirement. Under Calderon's stewardship, Goodyear entered into four major CRADA programs with Sandia National Laboratories, focused on the development of modeling tools for predicting composite performance.

== Awards ==
- 1994 – Carl-Dietrich Medal by DKG, the German Rubber Society
- 2020 – Charles Goodyear Medal of the Rubber Division of the American Chemical Society. Because Calderon passed away before the award ceremony, the award was accepted on his behalf by longtime collaborator and friend Adel Halasa. During his remarks, Halasa – an Arab originally from Jordan – said of Calderon: "Jewish and Arab, harmoniously we worked together as friends forever. Only in America. Here's what happened. He said to me, 'I love this country.' I said to him, 'I love this country.' Because both of us can sit down and eat lunch together. Only in America."
