= Mandelkern =

Mandelkern is an Ashkenazi Jewish surname. Notable people with the surname include:

- Leo Mandelkern (1922–2006), American polymer chemist and professor
- Salomon Mandelkern (1846–1902), Russian-Jewish poet and author

== See also ==
- Mandelker
