= C. Michael Roland =

American polymer scientist (1952–2021)

Charles Michael Roland (22 April 1952 – 2 October 2021) was an American polymer scientist. He was Head of the Polymer Physics Section at the Naval Research Lab in Washington DC from 1989 to 2015. His research was concerned primarily with the dynamics of condensed matter, including polymers and liquid crystals, with applications to military armor and infrastructure protection. He is noted for his development of elastomeric coatings for blast protection, and for diverse accomplishments in the field of elastomer science. From 1991-1999, he served as the 8th editor of the scientific journal Rubber Chemistry and Technology, and a Fellow of the American Physical Society and the Institute of Materials, Minerals, and Mining (UK).

== Personal ==
Roland was born in Trenton, New Jersey. He went by his middle name Michael to avoid confusion at home, as his father was also named Charles. He had one sister. His father worked for the post office after dropping out of school during the depression after the eighth grade. As a youth, Roland knew he wanted to go into science. He had a chemistry set and tried to make gunpowder. He enjoyed basketball and chose his undergraduate college in part for the opportunity to play, turning more to his studies after a knee injury.

== Education ==
Roland received his BS in Chemistry at Grove City College in 1974. He was late applying to graduate school, and so for a short time he worked as a lab instructor at a community college teaching chemistry. He soon was accepted to graduate school at Penn State working under advisor William A. Steele. He completed his Ph.D. in Chemistry in 1980. In his final year of grad school, he interviewed for jobs with Firestone, DuPont and American Cyanamid.

== Career ==
In 1981, Roland was recruited to Firestone's Central Research Labs by Georg Bohm, who persuaded Roland with an offer to work on long term research projects. Roland enjoyed his research and continued at Firestone until 1986, when due to poor economic conditions in the automotive sector and to R&D cuts in the aftermath of the Firestone 500 recall, he decided to seek employment elsewhere. He soon won a position with the United States Naval Research Laboratory. His first project looked at thermodynamically miscible blends of 1-4 polyisoprene and 1-2 polybutadiene. He worked on blast protection and on elastomer networks. During his career he produced 22 patents. He retired from NRL in 2020.

== Awards ==
- 1991 - Sparks-Thomas award of the Rubber Division of the American Chemical Society
- 2002 - Melvin Mooney Distinguished Technology Award of the Rubber Division of the American Chemical Society
- 2002 - Sigma Xi Award for Pure Science
- 2012 - Charles Goodyear Medal of the Rubber Division of the American Chemical Society
- 2019 - Colwyn Medal Institute of Materials, Minerals, and Mining (UK)
