= Eugene Guth =

Great Hungarian-American physicist

- Eugene Guth
- Born: August 21, 1905; Budapest, Austria-Hungary
- Died: July 5, 1990 (aged 84); Oak Ridge, Tennessee
- Education: University of Vienna
- Scientific career
- Fields: Physics
- Doctoral advisor: Hans Thirring

Eugene Guth (August 21, 1905 – July 5, 1990) was a Hungarian-American physicist who made contributions to polymer physics and to nuclear and solid state physics. He was awarded a Ph.D. in theoretical physics by the University of Vienna in 1928. He was a postdoctoral research associate with Wolfgang Pauli at the Austrian–German Science Foundation, Federal Institute of Technology (ETH) Zurich and University of Leipzig, with Werner Heisenberg from 1930 to 1931. He was professor at the University of Vienna (1932–1937) and the University of Notre Dame 1937–1955. He was at Oak Ridge National Laboratory from 1955 to 1971.

== Discoveries ==
He is noted for several pioneering discoveries that advanced the field of polymer physics, which was recognised by the award of the Bingham Medal for rheology in 1965. These included the treatment of the flexible, randomly kinked molecule in Brownian motion of polymers; the explanation of the entropic origin of the elastic force; and the Kinetic Theory of Rubber Elasticity.

Aside from establishing the first polymer physics laboratory at an academic institution in America, Dr. Guth had an international reputation in physics and polymer science. In 1976, he delivered the first plenary lecture on "Birth and Rise of Polymer Science - Myth and Truth," before the International Symposium on Applied Polymer Science. Two years later, he received the University of Vienna's Distinguished Alumnus Award, and in 1979, he was awarded the Honor Cross of Science and Arts by President Rudolf Kirchschläger of the Republic of Austria. He remained interested in science throughout his entire life. His last article was published posthumously in 1991 in the Journal of Polymer Science Part B.

Eugene Guth in 1990

== Legacy ==
A book, co-edited by his long-time friend and colleague Professor J. E. (Jim) Mark of the University of Cincinnati, was intended to celebrate Eugene Guth's 85th birthday, but subsequently was published as a memorial. The book is entitled "Elastomeric Polymer Networks", Prentice Hall Publishers, 1992, ISBN 0-13-249483-3. The oval picture to the right is found in the inside preface to that collected papers volume.

Eugene Guth made significant contributions to polymer physics, nuclear physics, solid state physics, and statistical mechanics. Below are some of his notable articles with full citations:

1. Guth, E., & Mark, H. (1934). Zur innermolekularen Statistik, insbesondere bei Kettenmolekülen I. Monatshefte für Chemie / Chemical Monthly, 65(1), 93–121. DOI: 10.1007/BF01522042
  - This paper derived the Kinetic Theory of Rubber Elasticity and laid the groundwork for the statistical mechanics of polymer chains.
2. Guth, E., & James, H. M. (1941). Elastic and Thermoelastic Properties of Rubberlike Materials. Industrial & Engineering Chemistry, 33(5), 624–629. DOI: 10.1021/ie50377a017
  - A foundational paper on the theory of rubber elasticity.
3. Guth, E., & James, H. M. (1942). Theory of the Elastic Properties of Rubber. The Journal of Chemical Physics, 10(7), 455–481. DOI: 10.1063/1.1723755
  - This paper further developed the statistical mechanical theory of rubber elasticity.
4. Guth, E. (1945). On the Statistical Theory of Rubber-Like Materials. Journal of Applied Physics, 16(1), 20–25. DOI: 10.1063/1.1707492
  - A key paper expanding on the statistical mechanics of rubber-like materials.
5. Guth, E. (1936). On the Hydrodynamical Theory of the Viscosity of Suspensions. Physical Review, 50(2), 115–122. DOI: 10.1103/PhysRev.50.115
  - This work contributed to the understanding of the viscosity of suspensions.
6. Guth, E., & Simha, R. (1936). Untersuchungen über die Viskosität von Suspensionen und Lösungen. 3. Über die Viskosität von Kugelsuspensionen. Kolloid-Zeitschrift, 74(3), 266–275. DOI: 10.1007/BF01428646
  - A study on the viscosity of spherical suspensions.
7. Guth, E. (1950). Theory of Filler Reinforcement. Journal of Applied Physics, 21(4), 321–323. DOI: 10.1063/1.1699658
  - This paper addressed the reinforcement of materials by fillers, relevant to polymer composites.
8. Guth, E. (1969). Statistical Mechanics of Chain Molecules. Journal of Polymer Science Part C: Polymer Symposia, 27(1), 89–98. DOI: 10.1002/polc.5070270110
  - A review of the statistical mechanics of polymer chains.

=== Additional Notes ===
- Guth's work on rubber elasticity and polymer physics is foundational and widely cited in the field.
