= Frederick W. Stavely =

Frederick W. Stavely (1894-1976) was a chemical research scientist who discovered polyisoprene.

== Career ==
Stavely was a classmate of Sidney M. Cadwell at the University of Chicago.

In 1950, Stavely served as chairman of the American Chemical Society Rubber Division.

In 1953, Stavely was working at the Firestone Tire & Rubber Company when he discovered polyisoprene. At the time he was investigating the reaction of butyl lithium on butadiene and discovered that polymerization of isoprene with metallic lithium produced polyisoprene (dubbed coral rubber because of its appearance) with a high cis content. High cis content is associated with enhanced strain crystallization, important during World War II because other synthetics did not exhibit the crystallization effect.

In 1972, Stavely received the Charles Goodyear Medal in recognition of this discovery.
