= Mercaptobenzothiazole =

Names
- Preferred IUPAC name 1,3-Benzothiazole-2(3H)-thione
- Other names Mercapto-2-benzothiazole; 2-MBT

Identifiers
CAS Number	149-30-4
3D model (JSmol)	Interactive image
Beilstein Reference	508810
ChEBI	CHEBI:34292
ChEMBL	ChEMBL111654
ChemSpider	608157
DrugBank	DB11496
ECHA InfoCard	100.005.216
EC Number	205-736-8
KEGG	C14437
PubChem CID	697993
UNII	5RLR54Z22K
CompTox Dashboard (EPA)	DTXSID1020807
- InChI: InChI=1S/C7H5NS2/c9-7-8-5-3-1-2-4-6(5)10-7/h1-4H,(H,8,9) Key: YXIWHUQXZSMYRE-UHFFFAOYSA-N; InChI=1/C7H5NS2/c9-7-8-5-3-1-2-4-6(5)10-7/h1-4H,(H,8,9) Key: YXIWHUQXZSMYRE-UHFFFAOYAK
- SMILES: c1ccc2c(c1)[nH]c(=S)s2

Properties
Chemical formula	C_{7}H_{5}NS_{2}
Molar mass	167.24 g·mol^{−1}
Appearance	white solid
Melting point	177–181 °C (351–358 °F; 450–454 K)

Hazards
- GHS labelling
Pictograms	(GHS07: Exclamation mark) (GHS09: Environmental hazard)
Signal word	Warning
Hazard statements	H317, H410
Precautionary statements	P261, P272, P273, P280, P302+P352, P321, P333+P313, P363, P391, P501
- Except where otherwise noted, data are given for materials in their standard state (at 25 °C [77 °F], 100 kPa). Infobox references

2-Mercaptobenzothiazole is an organosulfur compound with the formula C_{6}H_{4}(NH)SC=S. A white solid, it is a reagent in organic synthesis and, notably, for the sulfur vulcanization of rubber.

== Structure ==
Tautomers and deprotonated form of mercaptobenzothiazole

The molecule is planar in shape, with a C=S double bond, so the name mercaptobenzothiazole is a misnomer; a more appropriate name could be benzothiazoline-2-thione. Solution measurements by NMR spectroscopy could not identify the presence of the thiol tautomer that the name implies, instead it exists as a thione/dithiocarbamate and the hydrogen appears on the nitrogen in the gas-phase, solid state, and in solution. Theory indicates that the thione tautomer is about 39 kJ/mol lower in energy than the thiol, and a hydrogen-bonded dimer of the thione has even lower energy. At alkaline pH greater than 7 the deprotonated thiolate form is most abundant. A protonated form could not be observed in the pH range 2-11.

== Synthesis ==
The compound has been produced by many methods. Industrially, MBT is synthesised by the Kelly process (U.S. Pat. No. 1,631,871), whereby Sulfur, aniline and carbon disulfide are reacted under elevated pressure at elevated temperatures in a batch reactor. The industrial route entails the high temperature reaction of aniline and carbon disulfide in the presence of sulfur, which proceeds by this idealized equation:

C_{6}H_{5}NH_{2} + CS_{2} + S → C_{6}H_{4}(NH)SC=S + H_{2}S

The traditional route is the reaction of 2-aminothiophenol and carbon disulfide:

C_{6}H_{4}(NH_{2})SH + CS_{2} → C_{6}H_{4}(NH)SC=S + H_{2}S

This method was developed by the discoverer of the compound, A. W. Hoffmann. Other routes developed by Hoffmann include the reactions of carbon disulfide with 2-aminophenol and of sodium hydrosulfide with chlorobenzothiazole. Further synthetic advances were reported in the 1920s that included demonstration that phenyldithiocarbamates pyrolyze to benzothiazole derivative.

Industrially, MBT purification consists of a reprecipitation, wherein crude MBT is dissolved in sodium hydroxide solution, tar-like by-products are decanted off, filtered off or extracted. The aqueous sodium MBT solution is subjected to a further oxidative treatment, if appropriate; the MBT is then precipitated using sulfuric acid and filtered off (cf. German Patent 2,258,484). Unless captured, H2S escapes from the reaction upon completion of the reaction.

The mechanism of the reaction and identification of by-products was clarified by Neal Stuart Isaacs and Fyaz Mahmood Daud Ismail, his postdoctoral colleague, working at Reading University between 1989 and 1991 This process has been converted from batch to flow and optimised using chemometric methods. Shandong Yanggu Huatai Co., Ltd., is operating this optimised process at a 10,000-ton-scale MBT production plant. The simulation results allowed optimisation to a green synthesis of MBT, with optimal industrial production and, therefore, reducing pollution from this important industrial process.

== Reactions ==
The compound is insoluble in water but dissolves upon the addition of base, reflecting deprotonation. Treatment with Raney nickel results in monodesulfurization, giving benzothiazole:

C_{6}H_{4}(NH)SC=S + Ni → C_{6}H_{4}(N)SCH + NiS

The benzo ring undergoes electrophilic aromatic substitution at the position para to nitrogen.

S-alkylation of mercaptobenzothiazole gives thioether, which can be oxidized to the sulfone. This sequence sets the stage for the Modified Julia olefination.

Oxidation gives mercaptobenzothiazole disulfide. This disulfide reacts with amines to give sulfenamide derivatives such 2-morpholinodithiobenzothiazole. These compounds are used in sulphur vulcanization, where they act as accelerators.

Mercaptobenzothiazole disulfide (MBTS)

Dicyclohexyl-2-benzothiazolesulfenamide (DCBS)

Sodium mercaptobenzothiazole

== Uses ==
Using 2-mercaptobenzothiazole, rubber vulcanizes with less sulfur and at milder temperatures, both factors give a stronger product. This effect was reported by workers at Pirelli and at Goodyear Tire & Rubber. Lorin B. Sebrell won the 1942 Charles Goodyear Medal for his work on mercaptobenzothiazole.

In polymerization, it finds use as a radical polymerization inhibitor, chain transfer agent, reforming agent, and additive for photoinitiators.

The compound has also been used in the past in the gold-mining industry for the froth flotation of gold from ore residue as part of the extraction process.

Sodium salt is used as a biocide and preservative in adhesives (especially based on latex, starch, casein, and animal glues), paper, textiles. Often found together with sodium dimethyldithiocarbamate as e.g. Vancide 51. Zinc salt is used as a secondary accelerator in latex foam vulcanization.

It can be added to oil-based hydraulic fluids, heat-transfer fluids (oils, antifreezes), cutting fluids and other mixtures as a corrosion inhibitor, effective for copper and copper alloys.

It is also used in veterinary dermatology.

In electroplating it is used as a brightener for copper sulfate baths, at about 50-100 milligrams/liter. Also can be added to silver cyanide baths.

== Safety ==
Mercaptobenzothiazole has a low toxicity in mice, with an LD_{50} of > 960 mg/kg.

In 2016, it was identified by the World Health Organization as probably carcinogenic to humans.

It causes allergic contact dermatitis. The derivative morpholinylmercaptobenzothiazole is a reported allergen in protective gloves, including latex, nitrile, and neoprene gloves.

It becomes air-borne as a result of wear on car tires, and is able to be inhaled. Evidence suggests that benzothiazoles biodegrade readily.

== History ==
Benzothiazoles were long ago found to strongly influence the course of the vulcanization of rubber.
