= Ray P. Dinsmore =

Polymer scientist (1893–1979)

Ray Putnam Dinsmore (24 April 1893 – 26 October 1979) was a rubber scientist, known for pioneering the use of rayon as a reinforcing material in auto tires. In 1928, Dinsmore patented the first water-emulsion synthetic rubber in the United States. The material later became a staple of the rubber industry during the World War II shortage of natural rubber. Dinsmore worked for the Goodyear Tire and Rubber Company and developed Chemigum, an early synthetic rubber. Dinsmore hired noted rubber physicist Samuel D. Gehman, and he collaborated with Lorin Sebrell. His authored a popular review on the topic of rubber chemistry for the American Chemical Society's 75th Anniversary. Dinsmore served as chairman of the Rubber Division of the American Chemical Society in 1927. He received the 1947 Colwyn medal and was named the 1955 Charles Goodyear Medalist.

Dinsmore was educated at the Massachusetts Institute of Technology, completing a degree in chemical engineering at the age of 21. He entered the rubber industry in 1914. He was Vice President of Research and Development (1943-1961) and a Member of the Board of Directors (1960-1964) at the Goodyear Tire and Rubber Company.

He died on October 26, 1979.
