= Judit Puskas =

Polymer scientist and engineer

Judit Puskas is a Distinguished Ohio State University professor noted as co-inventor of the polymer used on the Taxus-brand coronary stent. She is the first woman to win the Charles Goodyear Medal, the highest honor conferred by the American Chemical Society's Rubber Division. Her research focuses on polymer engineering for breast reconstruction in cancer treatment, green polymer chemistry, biomimetic processes, biomaterials, living polymerization, polymerization mechanisms and kinetics, thermoplastic elastomers, polymer structure/property relationships, and polymer-bio interfaces.

== Education ==
She received her Ph.D. in Plastics and Rubber Technology/M.E. Organic and Biochemical Engineering from the Technical University of Budapest in 1985. She completed a postdoc under Joseph Kennedy at the University of Akron.

== Career ==
- 1989–1996 – Research Scientist at Bayer
- 1996–2004 – Professor at University of Western Ontario
- 2004–2018 – Professor at University of Akron
- 2019–present Professor at Ohio State University

== Awards ==
- 2017 – Charles Goodyear Medal of the Rubber Division of the American Chemical Society
