= William Geer =

William Geer may refer to:

- William Dudley Geer, Christian educator
- William C. Geer, chemist known for inventing the aircraft deicing boot
- Will Geer, American actor, musician, and social activist

== See also ==
- William Gee, English politician
