= Samuel D. Gehman =

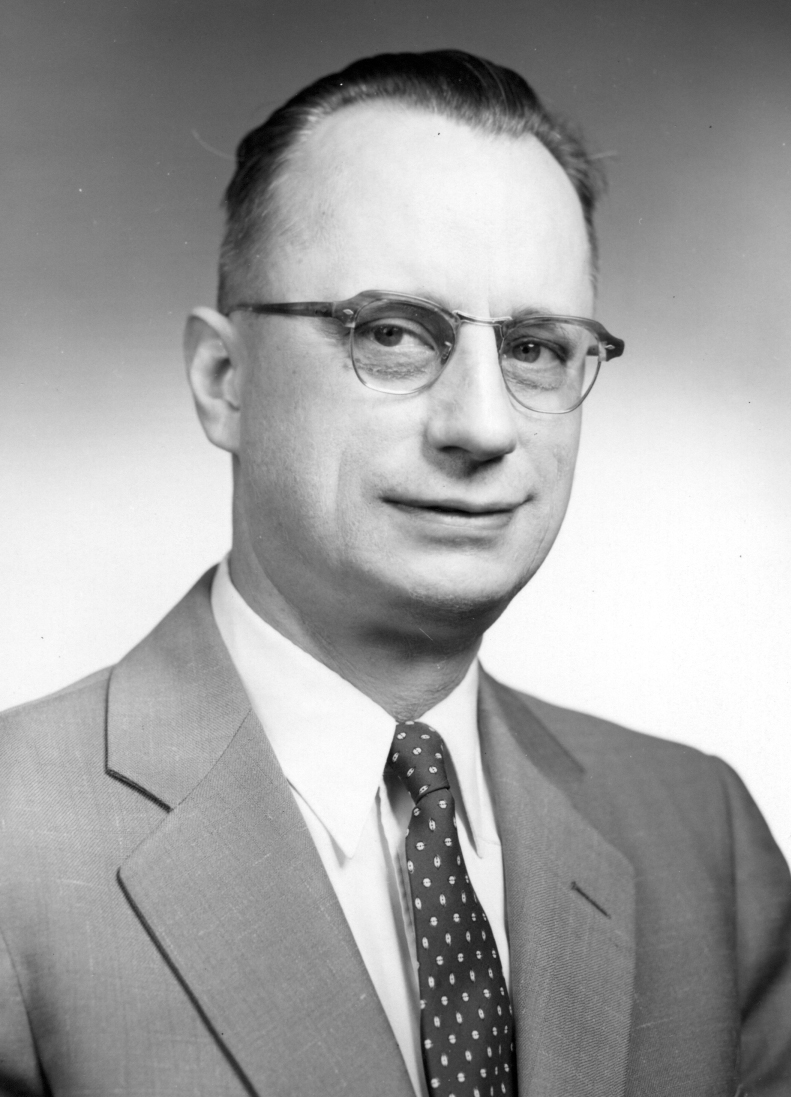
- Born: December 7, 1903; Altoona, Pennsylvania, US
- Died: June 1, 1992 (aged 88); Akron, Ohio, US
- Known for: Glass transition temperature of rubber
- Awards: Charles Goodyear Medal (1970)
- Scientific career
- Fields: Polymer science
- Workplaces: Goodyear Tire and Rubber Company

Samuel Dwight Gehman (December 7, 1903 – June 1, 1992) was an American physicist noted for development of a modulus-based measurement of rubber's glass transition temperature.

== Personal ==
Gehman was born on December 7, 1903. He died in Akron, Ohio, on June 1, 1992.

== Education ==
In 1922, he was one of eight sophomores selected for honors at the University of Pennsylvania. He completed his doctoral dissertation in 1929 on the topic Reflection of Soft X-rays.

== Career ==
Gehman was recruited to Goodyear by Ray P. Dinsmore. He made influential studies of strain crystallization via x-rays, of rubber's dynamic properties, and of heat transfer in rubber. He managed physics research at Goodyear's research division and was renowned for developing the Gehman low-temperature twist test, which gave laboratories convenient and precise low-temperature stiffening measurements of rubber compounds. He was an inventor of approximately 70 patents.

In 1972, Gehman was listed at 10th out of the 100 top contributors to the world's rubber literature published between 1932 and 1970.

Gehman retired in 1968 following 40 years with Goodyear Tire & Rubber Co.

== Awards and recognitions ==
- 1965 - Fellow of the American Physical Society
- 1970 - Charles Goodyear Medal from the ACS Rubber Division
