= Carroll C. Davis =

Carroll Campbell Davis was the first editor of the scientific journal Rubber Chemistry and Technology, serving from 1928 to 1957.

Davis was chief chemist at Boston Woven Hose and Rubber Company.

Davis graduated from MIT in 1914. He established a worldwide reputation in 1924 with the announcement of the first practical oxygen-aging test in the industry and the use of antioxidants in rubber. He had been an abstractor for Chemical Abstracts since 1919 and editor of its rubber section since 1925. Together with John T. Blake and W. F. Busse, he edited an early and popular account of rubber technology.

He received the Charles Goodyear Medal in 1950.

Davis died at the age of 69 on August 10, 1957.
