= Edward A. Murphy (chemist) =

Edward Arthur Murphy was a Dunlop researcher credited with the invention of latex foam, first marketed as Dunlopillo.

== Career ==
Murphy worked for Dunlop in Birmingham, UK. He is listed as an inventor on more than 40 patents.

== Awards and Recognitions ==
- 1929 - Invented Dunlopillo latex, used as pad seats in public trams, trains, trolley buses and cockpits
- 1931 - Invented first latex mattress
- 1949 - Colwyn medal
- 1966 - Charles Goodyear Medal from the ACS Rubber Division
