= Sidney M. Cadwell =

- Born: 5 March 1893; Bozeman, Montana
- Died: 24 June 1986 (aged 93)
- Education: University of Chicago
- Known for: Anti-oxidants and durability of rubber
- Awards: Charles Goodyear Medal (1956)
- Scientific career
- Fields: Polymer science
- Workplaces: United States Rubber Company

Sidney Marsh Cadwell (5 March 1893 – 24 June 1986) noted as discoverer of anti-oxidants for rubber. Cadwell published perhaps the first scientific study of the fatigue behavior of rubber.

Cadwell served as Chairman of the Rubber Division of the American Chemical Society in 1935 and was named the 1956 Charles Goodyear Medalist.

- PhD University of Chicago 1917 supervised by Julius Stieglitz, Frederick W. Stavely was a classmate
- World War I Captain in the Chemical Warfare Service.
- 1919 joined United States Rubber Company
- 1966 as director of Institute of Applied Chemistry and Physics at Wayne State University, received the Midgley Award of the ACS Detroit Section
