= Siegfried Wolff =

Siegfried Wolff is a now-retired Degussa chemist noted for first recognizing the potential of using silica in tire treads to reduce rolling resistance.

== Education ==
Siegfried Wolff was born in Germany.

== Career ==
Wolff started his career at Degussa in 1953 as a student apprentice, later moving into research and development of carbon black.

In the 1960s Wolff investigated the mechanisms of rubber reinforcement by fillers. He introduced new parameters for characterizing furnace black and silica, enabling improved quantification of the contribution of filler structure and surface area to rubber properties.

In addition, Wolff studied vulcanization systems using organosilanes and triazine-based chemicals.

Wolff originated the development of all-silica tire tread compounds. He first disclosed this use of silica to achieve low rolling resistance in papers presented in 1984 at the Tire Society meeting in Akron, Ohio.

Eventually, Wolff rose to the head of the department of applied research for fillers and rubber chemicals.

He retired in 1992.

== Honors and awards ==
- 1996 - Charles Goodyear Medal
