= Yasuyuki Tanaka =

Professor

- 田中 康之
- Born: 1935
- Died: May 1, 2009 (aged 73–74)
- Education: Osaka University
- Awards: Lavoisier Medal, Charles Goodyear Medal

Prof. Yasuyuki Tanaka (1935 - 1 May 2009) was a Tokyo University of Agriculture and Technology professor noted for elucidating the molecular structure of natural rubber, and for his work in synthetic rubber.

Tanaka received his M.S. (1961) and Ph.D. degrees from Osaka University in the chemistry of structural characterization of elastomers and synthesis of copolymers. After receiving his doctorate, he worked in industry at the Japan Synethic Rubber Company for 12 years. In 1973, he joined the Tokyo University of Agriculture and Technology from which he retired as a professor at the Division of Applied Chemistry in the Faculty of Technology in 2000. He joined the faculty of Chulalongkorn University in 1999 and Mahidol University in 2001.

Tanaka showed that natural rubber is a kind of long-chain telechelic polymer with peptide and phospholipid terminal groups. This was confirmed by the synthesis of model cis- 1,4-polyisoprenes.

Tanaka established a practical method for producing deproteinized natural rubber. Deproteinized natural rubber is free from allergens. His process was applied to the production of allergy-free condoms and gloves.

In 1998 the French Academy of Sciences awarded Tanaka the "Lavoisier Medal" for his work on the biosynthesis mechanism of natural rubber. In 1999, Tanaka received the Best Research Award from the Society of Rubber Industry, Japan, for his work on the preparation and application of deproteinized natural rubber.

Tanaka was the 2001 recipient of the Charles Goodyear Medal.

The Tanaka Rubber Science and Technology Award was created after his death to support exceptional researchers in rubber science and technology including the disciplines of chemistry, biology, physics, or engineering.
