= William B. Wiegand =

American carbon black scientist (1889–1976)

William B. Wiegand (February 17, 1889 – August 18, 1976) was a Canadian-born research chemist and later a chemicals industry executive. He was vice president of Columbian Carbon Co., known for his pioneering work on carbon black technology and for his early support for the development of the electron microscope. Wiegand developed a type of heat engine, the rubber pendulum, based on the Gough-Joule effect. Later in his career, he studied carbon black's reinforcing effect on rubber, and proposed that the effect arises due to forces acting at the interface between the carbon black and the surrounding elastomer matrix. He was a pioneer in developing the furnace method for producing carbon black. Wiegand was the 1923 ACS Rubber Division chair. He received the Colwyn medal in 1956 and the Charles Goodyear Medal in 1960.

Wiegand was born in Conestogo, Ontario, Canada on February 17, 1889. He earned an undergraduate degree in chemistry in 1912 and a masters in physics in 1913 from the University of Toronto. He died in Bernardston, Massachusetts on August 18, 1976, at the age of 87.
