= Mandelker =

Mandelker is an Ashkenai Jewish surname. Notable people with the surname include:

- Daniel R. Mandelker, American legal scholar
- Sigal Mandelker (born 1971), American lawyer

== See also ==
- Mandelkern
