= Jean-Marie Massoubre =

Jean Marie Massoubre (23 November 1921 - 23 August 2020) was a Michelin engineer associated with the early development of the radial tire. He was later in his career on the board of directors of Michelin.

Massoubre received his education in chemistry from ENSIC. During the school year 1943-1944, he received a research allowance to work as a Practical Work Monitor in physical chemistry. The allowance was renewed for the year 1944-1945, but Massoubre resigned as of 1 October 1944.

Massoubre was an R & D coordinator at Michelin. Over his career he received many patents for tire technology. He was elected to the Board of Directors on November 21, 1986. He was re-elected to the Board of Directors on December 15, 1989, and elected Honorary Chairman of the Board of Directors on November 13, 1992.

Massoubre was the 1976 recipient of the Colwyn Medal. He was the 1989 recipient of the Charles Goodyear Medal.
