= Charles Goodyear Medal =

Award by the American Chemical Society, Rubber Division

The Charles Goodyear Medal
- Awarded for: "outstanding invention, innovation, or development which has resulted in a significant change or contribution to the nature of the rubber industry"
- Presented by: American Chemical Society Rubber Division
- First award: 1941
- Website: http://www.rubber.org/s-t-awards

The Charles Goodyear Medal is the highest honor conferred by the American Chemical Society, Rubber Division. Established in 1941, the award is named after Charles Goodyear, the discoverer of vulcanization, and consists of a gold medal, a framed certificate and prize money. The medal honors individuals for "outstanding invention, innovation, or development which has resulted in a significant change or contribution to the nature of the rubber industry". Awardees give a lecture at an ACS Rubber Division meeting, and publish a review of their work in the society's scientific journal Rubber Chemistry and Technology.

== Recipients ==
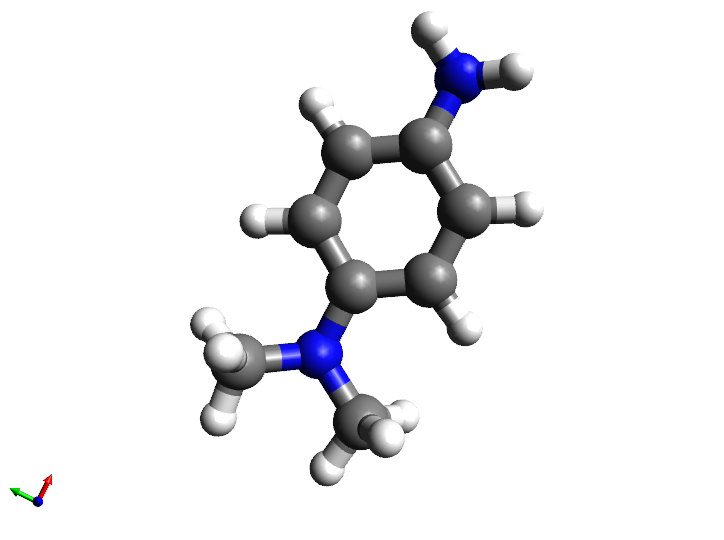
Diamond Rubber Co. researchers David Spence and George Oenslager developed Para-aminodimethylaniline as a vulcanization accelerator in 1912.

- 1941 David Spence – Diamond Rubber Co. researcher noted for synthesizing isoprene for use in synthetic rubber
- 1942 Lorin B. Sebrell – Goodyear Research Director noted for his work on organic accelerators for vulcanization
- 1944 Waldo L. Semon – early developer of synthetic rubber, in particular Ameripol for B. F. Goodrich
- 1946 Ira Williams – duPont developer of Neoprene
- 1948 George Oenslager – B. F. Goodrich chemist known for pioneering vulcanization accelerator chemistry
- 1949 Harry L. Fisher – 69th national president of the American Chemical Society, and an authority on the chemistry of vulcanization

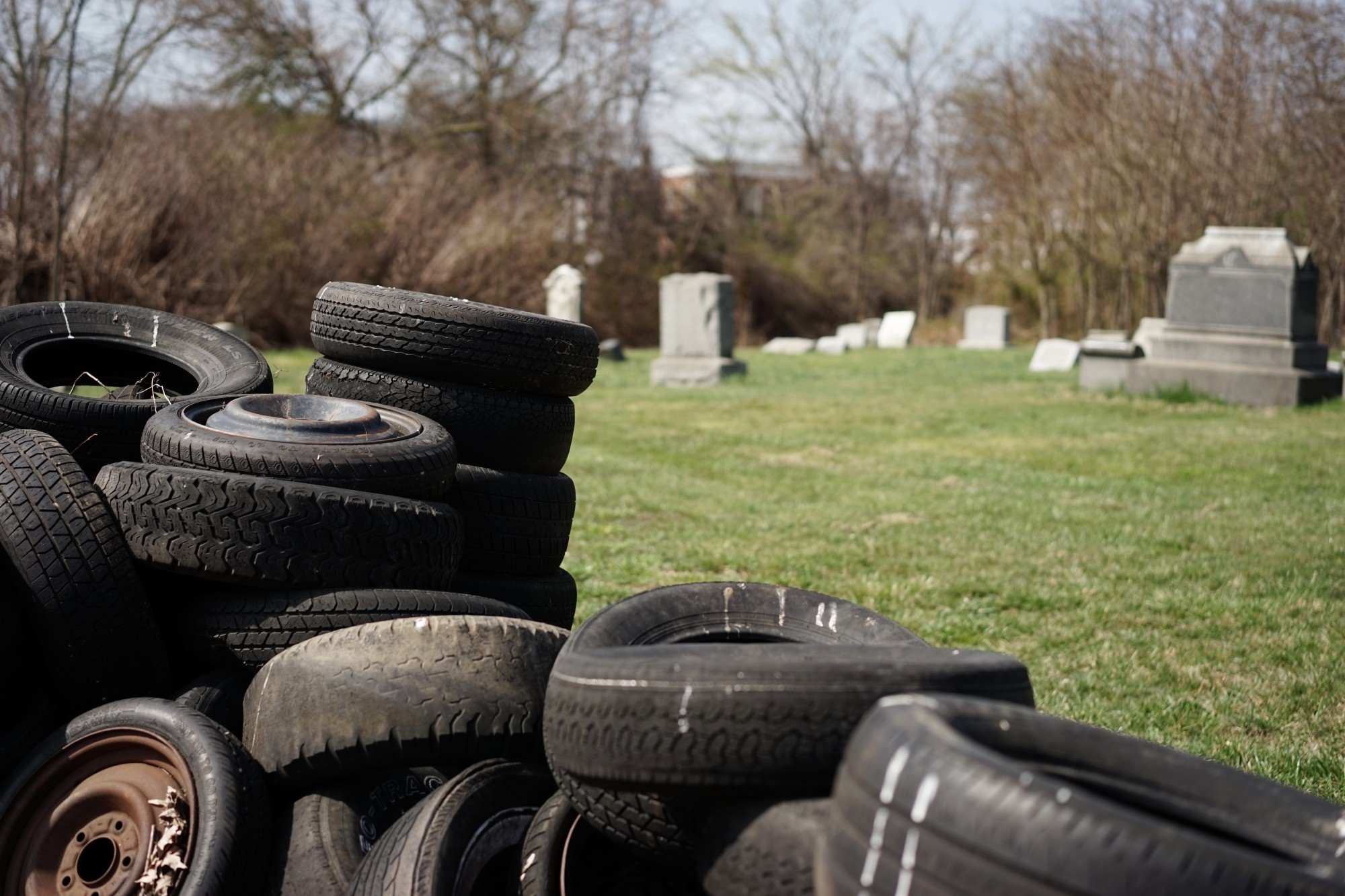
Oxidative ageing was an early challenge in the rubber industry. Carroll C. Davis, William C. Geer, Sidney M. Cadwell and Herbert A. Winkelmann all made important contributions to testing and compounding strategies for ageing.

- 1950 Carroll C. Davis – first editor of Rubber Chemistry and Technology, serving from 1928 to 1957, and developer of the first practical oxygen-aging test in the industry and the use of antioxidants in rubber
- 1951 William C. Geer – B. F. Goodrich pioneer in studying rubber ageing, and developer of early aircraft de-icing systems
- 1952 Howard E. Simmons – Dupont chemist that discovered the Simmons–Smith reaction
- 1953 John T. Blake – Research director at Simplex Wire and Cable company, pioneered understanding of rubber as an electrical insulator
- 1954 George S. Whitby – Head of the University of Akron rubber laboratory, for many years the only teacher of rubber chemistry in the USA
- 1955 Ray P. Dinsmore – Goodyear pioneer of the use of rayon as a reinforcing material in auto tires
- 1956 Sidney M. Cadwell – United States Rubber Company researcher noted as discoverer of antioxidants for rubber.
- 1957 Arthur W. Carpenter – past president of ASTM, known for contributions to quality control for rubber
- 1958 Joseph C. Patrick – Thiokol Chemical Company inventor of first American synthetic elastomer – Thiokol (polymer)
- 1959 Fernley H. Banbury – Farrel Corporation executive and inventor of the Banbury mixer

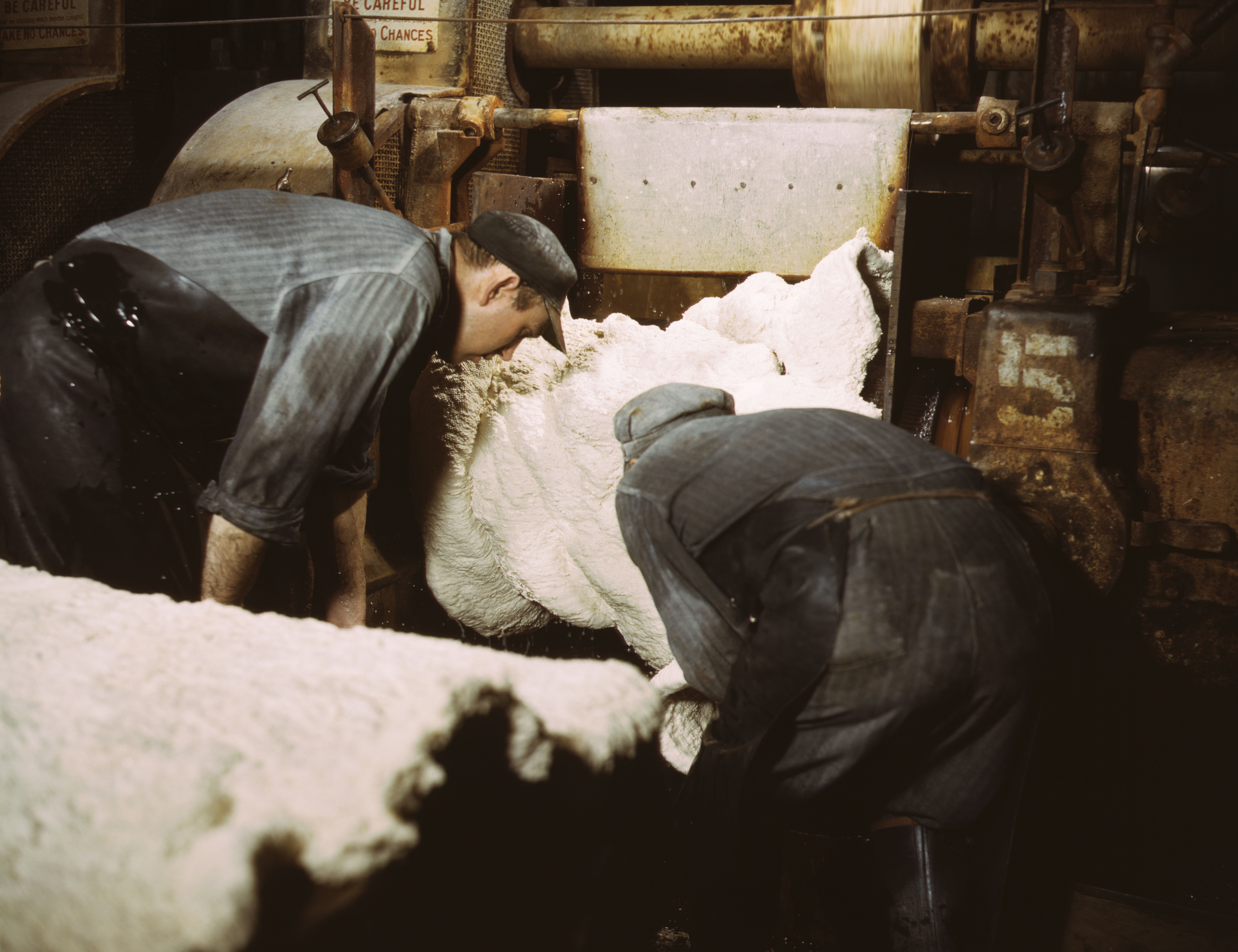
Sheet of synthetic rubber coming off the rolling mill at the plant of Goodrich (1941). Important contributions to synthetic rubbers came from many Goodyear medalists: David Spence, Ira Williams, Joseph C. Patrick, William J. Sparks, Robert M. Thomas, Frederick W. Stavely, Arnold M. Collins, Otto Bayer, Earl L. Warrick, James D. D'Ianni, Samuel E. Horne, Jr., and Roderic Quirk

- 1960 William B. Wiegand – researcher at Columbian Carbon Co. who demonstrated the effect of carbon black particle size on rubber reinforcement
- 1961 Herbert A. Winkelmann – B. F. Goodrich developer of first commercially feasible antioxidant
- 1962 Melvin Mooney – United States Rubber Company physicist and rheologist responsible for the Mooney viscometer and the Mooney-Rivlin solid constitutive relation
- 1963 William J. Sparks – Exxon chemist and co-inventor of Butyl rubber
- 1964 Arthur E. Juve – B. F. Goodrich Director of Technology who developed oil-resistant rubber compositions, lab tests for tire treads, and improvements in manufacture of rubber products and the processing of synthetic rubber
- 1965 Benjamin S. Garvey - worked for B.F. Goodrich and Pennsalt Chemicals. Dr. Garvey developed the "10 Gram Evaluation Process."
- 1966 Edward A. Murphy – Dunlop researcher credited with invention of latex foam, first marketed as Dunlopillo
- 1967 Norman Bekkedahl - pioneered understanding of Glass transition in elastomers, and former Deputy Chief of the Polymers Division at the National Bureau of Standards
- 1968 Paul J. Flory – Cornell University pioneer in the physical chemistry of macromolecules, later a Nobel laureate
- 1969 Robert M. Thomas – Exxon chemist and co-inventor of Butyl rubber

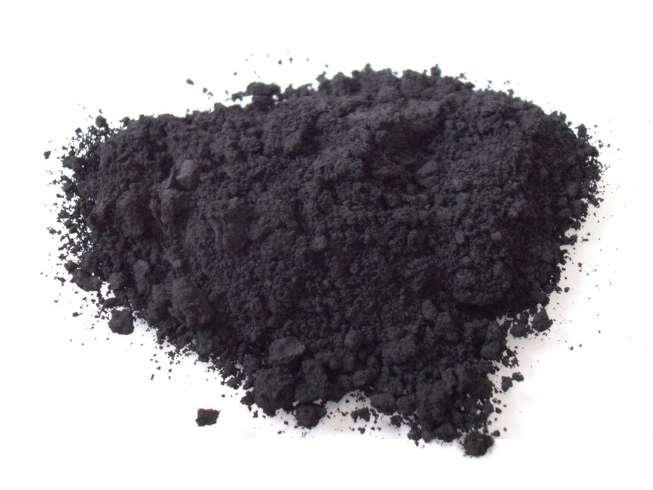
The use of Carbon black and silica as fillers for rubber was pioneered by George Oenslager, William B. Wiegand, Joseph C. Krejci, Siegfried Wolff, and Jean-Baptiste Donnet.

- 1970 Samuel D. Gehman – Goodyear physicist noted for development of a modulus-based measurement of rubber's glass transition temperature
- 1971 Harold J. Osterhof - inventor of Pliofilm, a plasticized rubber hydrochloride cast film, and director of research at Goodyear Tire & Rubber Co.
- 1972 Frederick W. Stavely - Firestone researcher responsible for development of synthetic polyisoprene a.k.a. "coral rubber"
- 1973 Arnold M. Collins – polychloroprene developer at DuPont
- 1974 Joseph C. Krejci – Phillips researcher known for developing oil furnace method to make carbon black
- 1975 Otto Bayer – head of the research group at IG Farben that discovered the polyaddition for the synthesis of polyurethanes out of polyisocyanate and polyol
- 1976 Earl L. Warrick – Dow Corning pioneer of silicone elastomer chemistry and inventor of Silly Putty
- 1977 James D. D'Ianni – Goodyear scientist noted for contributions in the development of synthetic rubber
- 1978 Frank Herzegh – Goodrich inventor of the first successful tubeless tire and owner of patents for over 100 inventions in the field of tire technology
- 1979 Francis P. Baldwin – Exxon Chief Scientist noted for his work on chemical modifications of low functionality elastomers

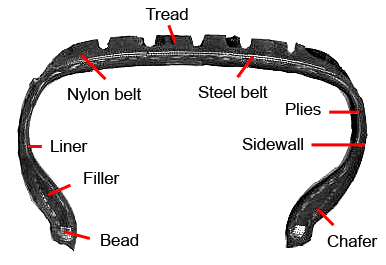
Tire technology has been advanced greatly due to contributions of medalists Lorin B. Sebrell, Ray P. Dinsmore, James D. D'Ianni, Frank Herzegh, Herman E. Schroeder, Jean-Marie Massoubre, Adel F. Halasa, Karl A. Grosch, Joseph Kuczkowski, Georg Bohm.

- 1980 Samuel E. Horne, Jr. – Goodrich chemist who first polymerized synthetic polyisoprene using Ziegler catalyst
- 1981 John D. Ferry – University of Wisconsin–Madison chemistry professor noted for co-authoring the Williams–Landel–Ferry equation
- 1982 Adolf Schallamach – MRPRA researcher who pioneered understanding of the mechanisms of tire traction, abrasion and wear
- 1983 J. Reid Shelton – professor at Case Western University known for contributions to understanding of oxidation and antioxidants in rubber, and for application of laser-Raman spectroscopy to the study of sulfur vulcanization
- 1984 Herman E. Schroeder – R&D Director at DuPont and a pioneer in the development of tire cord adhesion and specialty elastomers
- 1985 Maurice Morton – Inaugural director of the Institute of Rubber Research at the University of Akron
- 1986 Leonard Mullins – MRPRA research director who first described the effect of prior overloads on rubber's stress-strain curve (i.e. the Mullins effect)
- 1987 Norman R. Legge – Shell Oil Company researcher and pioneer of thermoplastic elastomers
- 1988 Herman F. Mark – Polytechnic Institute of Brooklyn faculty known as the "father of polymer science" for his early work focused on the crystal structure of natural rubber and other polymers
- 1989 Jean-Marie Massoubre – Michelin researcher associated with early development of the radial tire

Time–temperature superposition of the viscoelastic response of rubber underlies much of rubber's mechanical behavior. Goodyear medalists contributing to understanding rubber's mechanical properties include: Melvin Mooney, Norman Bekkedahl, John D. Ferry, Samuel D. Gehman, Adolf Schallamach, Leonard Mullins, Alan N. Gent, Ronald S. Rivlin, Alan G. Thomas, Graham J. Lake, Robert F. Landel, Karl A. Grosch, Alan D. Roberts, and C. Michael Roland.

- 1990 Alan N. Gent – University of Akron professor who contributed to understanding adhesion physics, and fracture of rubbery, crystalline and glassy polymers
- 1991 Edwin J. Vandenberg – chemist at Hercules Inc. known for discovery of isotactic polypropylene and the development of Ziegler-type catalysts
- 1992 Ronald S. Rivlin – MRPRA physicist and developer of finite elasticity theory for elastomers
- 1993 Leo Mandelkern – Florida State University Distinguished Professor of Chemistry, pioneered understanding of crystallization in polymers
- 1994 Alan G. Thomas – MRPRA physicist and developer of fracture mechanics theory for elastomers
- 1995 Aubert Y. Coran – Monsanto researcher responsible for invention of thermoplastic elastomer Geolast
- 1996 Siegfried Wolff – Degussa scientist who first recognized the potential for using silica in tire treads to reduce rolling resistance
- 1997 Adel F. Halasa – Goodyear scientist who developed a terpolymer rubber of styrene, isoprene and butadiene (SIBR) that was used in the Aquatred tire
- 1998 Jean-Baptiste Donnet – CNRS pioneer in surface chemistry of carbon black
- 1999 James E. Mark – University of Cincinnati pioneer in molecular dynamics computer simulations of rubber elasticity

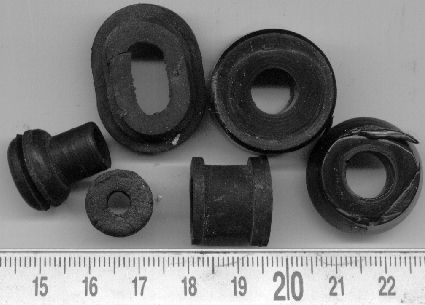
Goodyear medalists have contributed to many non-tire applications of rubber technology, including: John T. Blake, Joseph C. Patrick, Edward A. Murphy, Earl L. Warrick, Joseph P. Kennedy, C. Michael Roland, Judit Puskas.

- 2000 Jack L. Koenig – Case Western Reserve University professor who pioneered spectroscopic methods of polymer characterization
- 2001 Yasuyuki Tanaka – Tokyo University of Agriculture and Technology professor noted for elucidating the molecular structure of natural rubber
- 2003 Graham J. Lake – former pro cricketer and MRPRA pioneer in understanding fatigue behavior of rubber
- 2006 Robert F. Landel – Caltech Jet Propulsion Laboratory physical chemist noted for co-authoring the Williams–Landel–Ferry equation
- 2007 Karl A. Grosch – Uniroyal scientist who pioneered in the study of friction and abrasion in relation to tire traction and wear
- 2008 Joseph P. Kennedy – University of Akron Polymer Science professor and inventor of the polystyrene-polyisobutylene-polystyrene triblock polymeric coating on the Taxus Drug-eluting stent
- 2009 James L. White – University of Akron Polymer Engineering professor who developed numerical models of rubber rheological behavior in batch and continuous mixing machines
- 2010 Edward Kresge – Exxon Chief Polymer Scientist who developed tailored molecular weight density EPDM elastomers
- 2011 Joseph Kuczkowski – Goodyear chemist who elucidated mechanisms of antioxidant function, resulting in the commercialization of several new antioxidant systems
- 2012 C. Michael Roland – Naval Research Lab scientist recognized for blast and impact protection using elastomers, and for diverse contributions to elastomer science
- 2013 Russell A. Livigni – Gencorp scientist known for discovery and development of barium-based catalysts for the polymerization of butadiene and its copolymerization with styrene to give high trans rubbers with low vinyl content
- 2014 Alan D. Roberts – TARRC physicist noted for contributions to understanding friction and contact in elastomers, in particular the JKR equation
- 2015 Sudhin Datta – ExxonMobil Chemical scientist noted for development of Vistamaxx propylene-based elastomers.
- 2016 Georg Bohm- Bridgestone scientist noted for development of electron beam pre-curing of elastomers
- 2017 Judit Puskas – Ohio State University scientist noted as co-inventor of the polymer used on the Taxus-brand coronary stent
- 2018 Eric Baer – Case Western Reserve University professor noted for contributions to understanding elastomeric polyolefins and rubber toughening of brittle polymers, and for founding the university's Department of Macromolecular Science and Engineering.
- 2019 Roderic Quirk – University of Akron professor noted for contributions to anionic polymerization technology that is used to produce butadiene, isoprene and styrene homo and block copolymers.
- 2020 Nissim Calderon – Goodyear Tire & Rubber Company researcher who first demonstrated olefin metathesis and later applied it to development of new elastomers, copolymers, terpolymers, alternating copolymers and oligomers.
- 2021 Joseph DeSimone – American chemist, inventor, entrepreneur and co-founder of Carbon, the 3D Manufacturing company that commercialized his Continuous Liquid Interface Production (CLIP) technology.
- 2022 Timothy B. Rhyne and Steven M. Cron – Michelin engineers who jointly invented and developed non-pneumatic tire technology for the Tweel and Uptis tires.
- 2023 Christopher Macosko - University of Minnesota professor emeritus who invented a rheometer for the rubber industry and co-founded Rheometric Scientific.
- 2024 Katrina Cornish - Ohio State University professor known for development of alternative sources of natural rubber.
- 2025 Gert Heinrich - TU Dresden professor known for contributions to "statistical-mechanical and constitutive continuum theory, molecular dynamics, friction theory and fracture mechanics" of polymers.
- 2026 Gregory McKenna - North Carolina State University professor known for contributions to thermodynamics of cross‑linked rubbers and glassy polymers, nonlinear viscoelasticity, and ageing

== See also ==
- List of engineering awards
- List of chemistry awards
- International Rubber Science Hall of Fame: Another ACS award
- Melvin Mooney Distinguished Technology Award
- Sparks-Thomas award
