= Ira Williams =

American chemist

Ira Williams (1894–1977) was an American chemist at DuPont's Jackson Laboratory in New Jersey, who in the summer of 1930, together with Wallace Carothers, Arnold Collins and F. B. Downing, made commercial Neoprene possible by producing a soft, plastic form of chloroprene that could be processed by the rubber industry. Early accounts of the development credited Julius Nieuwland with synthesizing the precursor divinylacetylene. Williams' contribution was the discovery that the rheological behavior of the product could be controlled by quenching the polymerization reaction with alcohol.

He won the 1946 Charles Goodyear Medal.
