= Fernley H. Banbury =

Fernley Hope Banbury
- Born: 22 December 1881; Cornwall, United Kingdom
- Died: 26 May 1963 (aged 81); Torquay, England
- Education: Purdue University
- Known for: Banbury mixer
- Awards: Charles Goodyear Medal (1959)
- Scientific career
- Fields: Polymer engineering
- Workplaces: Farrel Corporation

Fernley Hope Banbury (22 December 1881 – 26 May 1963) was an English scientist and engineer. He invented the Banbury mixer, which is used to mix or blend a wide range of materials used in different industries including the food, chemical, pharmaceutical, plastic, rubber and mineral industries.

== Biography ==
He was born in England on 22 December 1881 in Cornwall, England. In 1904, he migrated to the United States, and earned a B.S. in electrical engineering from Purdue University in 1906, with a thesis titled "Test of New Lighting Plant". His yearbook records this about him: "if genuine English perseverance coupled with absolute honesty can achieve success, Fernly has a bright future." He received the Charles Goodyear Medal in 1959, one of only two electrical engineers ever to do so (the other being Adolf Schallamach). He was an executive at the Farrel Corporation of Ansonia, Connecticut. He died on 26 May 1963 in Torquay, England.
