= Katrina Cornish =

American polymer scientist

Katrina Cornish is an Ohio State University professor noted for developing natural rubber-producing alternatives to hevea brasiliensis.

== Education ==
Cornish earned her B.Sc. with 1st class honors in 1978 at the University of Birmingham in the Biological Sciences program. In 1982, she completed a Ph.D. in Plant Biology at the same school.

== Career ==
Cornish began her work on rubber in 1987 at Arizona State University. In 1989, the U.S. Department of Agriculture hired her to its ARS Western Regional Research Center in Albany, California where she led a program to produce natural rubber from goldenrod or guayule. In 1997, Cornish patented a process to produce hypoallengic latex from guayule, and the patent was licensed to Yulex. She joined Yulex in 2004 as Vice President of R&D. In 2010, Cornish joined the faculty at the Wooster, Ohio campus of Ohio State University as professor and research scholar for bioemergent materials.

== Awards ==
- 2018 - Lifetime Achievement Award from the Bioenvironmental Polymer Society
- 2024 – Charles Goodyear Medal of the Rubber Division of the American Chemical Society
