= Graham Lake (cricketer) =

English cricketer and scientist

- Born: 13 April 1935; Croydon, Surrey, England
- Died: 15 February 2023 (aged 87)
- Education: University of London
- Known for: Rubber fatigue
- Awards: Charles Goodyear Medal (2003)
- Scientific career
- Fields: Polymer science
- Workplaces: BRPRA

Graham Lake
Cricket information
- Batting: Right-handed
- Bowling: Right-arm fast-medium

Domestic team information
- Years: Team
- 1956–1958: Gloucestershire

Career statistics
Competition	First-class
Matches	13
Runs scored	106
Batting average	7.57
100s/50s	0/0
Top score	18
Balls bowled	1,017
Wickets	17
Bowling average	27.29
5 wickets in innings	0
10 wickets in match	0
Best bowling	4/39
Catches/stumpings	6/–
- Source: Cricinfo, 1 August 2011

Graham Johnson Lake (13 April 1935 – 15 February 2023) was an English scientist known for his contributions to understanding rubber's fatigue limit, and a former professional English cricketer.

== Scientific career ==
Lake began his scientific career as a research assistant in 1958 at the British Rubber Producer's Research Association. During his employment at BRPRA, he attended evening classes at the University of London, achieving a B.Sc. in Physics in 1962, and a Ph.D. in 1967. He undertook fundamental studies of the fatigue properties of elastomers, and established the principle that fatigue cracks develop from pre-existing features of rubber's microstructure, in accordance with the expectations of Fracture Mechanics. Together with doctoral student Oon Hock Yeoh he also studied the mechanics of cutting of rubber with a blade, thereby establishing the principle that rubber's intrinsic strength and fatigue limit are the same and that they can be measured via cutting experiments.

Lake received the 1995 Colwyn Medal. In 2003, he received the Charles Goodyear Medal in recognition of the significance of his contributions to rubber science.

A symposium was organized in 2003 to honor the 50th anniversary of the development of Fracture Mechanics for rubber, and the symposium title was chosen as 'Fracture Mechanics and Elastomers: 50 not out', in reference to Lake's past career as a professional cricketer.

== Cricket ==
Lake was a right-arm fast-medium bowler and right-handed tail-end batsman.

Lake made his first-class debut for Gloucestershire against Sussex in the 1956 County Championship. He made 12 further first-class appearances, the last of which came against Oxford University in 1958. In his 13 first-class matches, he scored 106 runs at an average of 7.57, with a high score of 18. With the ball, he took 17 wickets at a bowling average of 27.29, with best figures of 4/39.
