= Norman Bekkedahl =

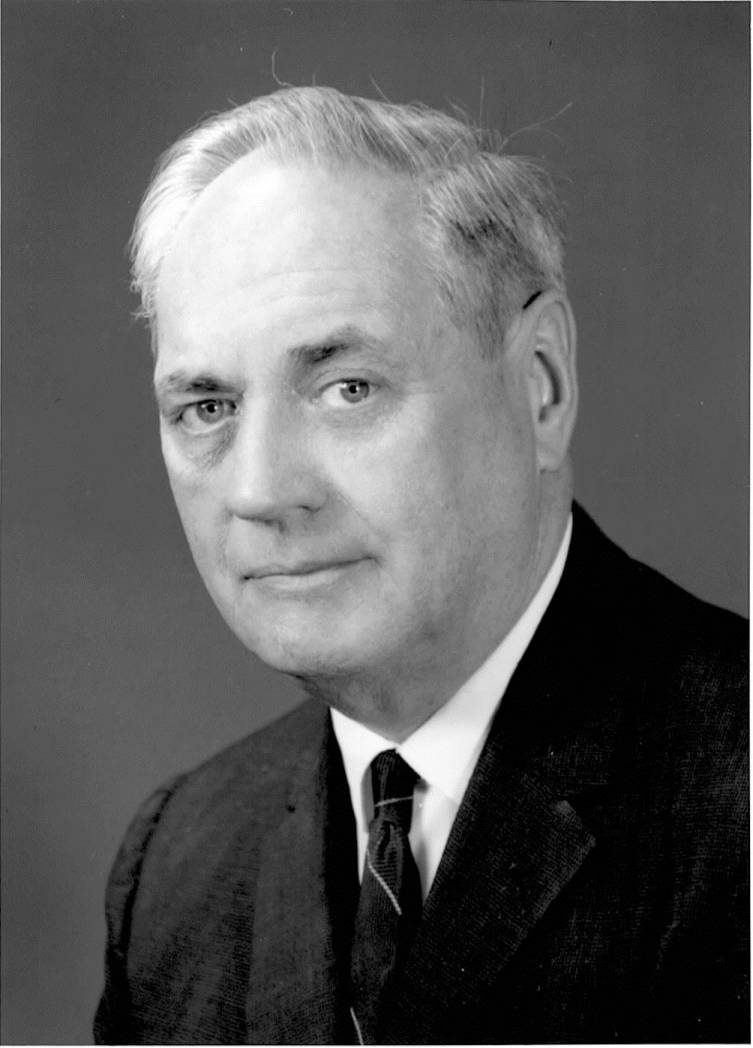
Norman Bekkedahl

Norman Bekkedahl (1903–1986) was Deputy Chief of the Polymers Division at the Institute for Materials Research of the National Bureau of Standards. Bekkedahl received the 1967 Charles Goodyear Medal for his work with the application of thermodynamics to natural rubber, in particular the application of dilatometry to studying glass transition and crystallization of rubber. In 1995, he was inducted into the International Rubber Science Hall of Fame.

Bekkedahl made one of the first investigations of the glass transition of rubber and wrote more than 40 technical articles on rubber. He studied chemical engineering at the University of Minnesota. He continued his studies at George Washington University and received his Ph.D. from the American University in Washington, DC. He worked at the American Sugar Beet Company, the U.S. Department of Agriculture, and the National Bureau of Standards (Polymers Division).
