= Joseph C. Krejci =

- Born: December 19, 1910; Galveston, Texas, US
- Died: August 23, 1991 (aged 80); Borger, Texas, US
- Education: University of Texas
- Known for: Carbon black
- Awards: Charles Goodyear Medal (1974)
- Scientific career
- Fields: Polymer science
- Workplaces: Phillips Carbon Black Company

Joseph C. Krejci (December 19, 1910 – August 23, 1991) was a chemical engineering associate and manager of the Pyrolysis section at the Phillips Carbon Black Research facility in Borger, Texas. He is known for his work in developing the oil furnace production process for carbon black.

== Personal ==
Krejci was born on 19 December 1910 in Galveston, Texas, the 2nd of 9 children. He married Fay Deen Yarbro Jan. 29, 1938 in Mineral Wells. He died on 23 August 1991 in Borger, Texas.

== Education ==
Dr. Krejci obtained his Bachelor of Science, master's of science and Ph.D. degrees in chemical engineering from the University of Texas.

== Career ==
He was a chemical engineering associate and manager of pyrolysis at the Phillips Carbon Black Research facility in Borger. He retired in 1971 following 34 years of service.

Krejci was the inventor of 31 patents in the carbon black field, many of these were also patented outside the United States. His earliest patent was a process for producing furnace black. His most cited patent was for a process for improving yield and quality in the manufacture of high-reinforcing carbon black.

== Awards and recognitions ==
- 1974 - Charles Goodyear Medal from the ACS Rubber Division
