= Earl L. Warrick =

American chemist (1911–2002)

- Born: Earl Leathen Warrick; September 23, 1911; Butler, Pennsylvania
- Died: November 15, 2002 (aged 91); Loma Linda, California
- Education: Carnegie Institute of Technology
- Known for: claimed credit for creation of Silly Putty
- Awards: Charles Goodyear Medal (1976)
- Scientific career
- Fields: Chemistry

Earl Leathen Warrick (September 23, 1911 – November 15, 2002) was an American industrial chemist at Dow Corning who is noted for his claim to being the inventor of Silly Putty.

Warrick was the 1976 recipient of the Charles Goodyear Medal.

== Early life and education ==
Warrick was born in Butler, Pennsylvania. He earned his bachelor's, master's and doctoral degree in 1943 from the Carnegie Institute of Technology in Pittsburgh.

== Career ==
Warrick joined Dow Corning in 1943. In the early days of World War II, while investigating methods for producing synthetic rubber, Warrick combined silicone oil with boric oxide. This resulted in a pliable, elastic, nontoxic substance that was not suitable as a rubber substitute. Its potential as a toy was recognized by a toy store owner and was successfully marketed as Silly Putty. Warrick played a central role in the invention and development of silicone rubber. He later managed an operation that produced silicon for microchips. He retired from Corning in 1976, having produced 44 patents. In retirement, he twice served as acting dean of the School of Science, Engineering and Technology at Saginaw Valley State University in Midland, Michigan.

== Death ==
Warrick died in his home in Loma Linda, California, at the age of 91 on November 15, 2002.
