= David Spence (rubber chemistry) =

Chemist

- Born: September 26, 1881; Udny, Scotland
- Died: September 24, 1957 (aged 75); New York, New York
- Citizenship: United Kingdom (1881-1906) United States (1906-1957)
- Education: University of Jena (Ph.D., 1906)
- Awards: Charles Goodyear Medal (1941)
- Scientific career
- Fields: Chemistry
- Workplaces: Diamond Rubber, B.F. Goodrich, Norwalk Tire & Rubber, International Rubber Company
- Thesis: (1906)

David Spence (September 26, 1881 – September 24, 1957) was one of the pioneering rubber chemists. He helped the war effort during the Second World War by devising new ways of extracting natural rubbers from plants, and worked to improve the processing of the rubber. Over the course of his career, he worked to improve the dyeing processes for rubber products and the vulcanization of rubber, and in developing new accelerants for strengthening lower-quality natural rubber. In 1941, he became the first recipient of the Charles Goodyear Medal, awarded by the American Chemical Society.

== Biography ==
David was the son of the Rev. Alexander Spence (Minister of the Church of Scotland) and his wife, Agnes Spence nee Barclay (who were married in Scoonie on 15 Jun 1876). He was born at 7:00 am on 26 September 1881 at The Manse at Udny, Aberdeen County, Scotland. He was "vaccinated as per certificate dated December 18th 1881".

Spence earned his PhD from the University of Jena in Germany in 1906. Three years later, he accepted a position as the research lab director at the Diamond Rubber Company in Akron, Ohio.

He stayed at Diamond Rubber after it was purchased by B.F. Goodrich in 1912. There, he succeeded in synthesizing isoprene for use in synthetic rubber. He left the company in 1914, and started the Norwalk Tire & Rubber Company, where he was vice president and manager until 1925. He retired in 1931, after which he continued to do his own rubber research.

During his career, he was responsible for developing several different processes: he developed accelerators for the vulcanization process; a process to devulcanize rubber; a system to extract natural rubber from guayule; and a process to modify the physical properties of rubber. During World War I, Spence headed the National Research Council's Rubber Division, and he was a consultant to the War Production Board during World War II. In 1941, he became the first recipient of the Charles Goodyear Medal. He died on September 24, 1957, in New York.

== Scientific career ==
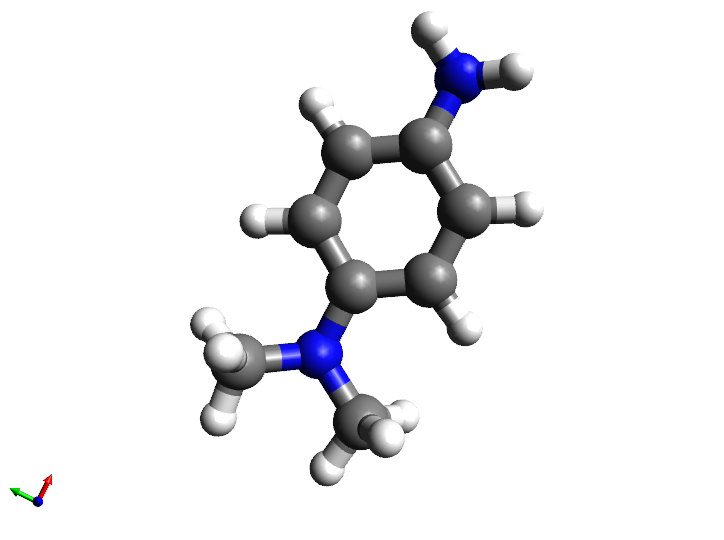
Para-aminodimethylaniline

=== Organic accelerators ===
In the early years of rubber production, high quality natural rubber was obtained from the tree, Hevea braziliensis, found in the regions bordering the Amazon river. The high quality rubber exhibited desired properties, such as a high tensile strength (greater than 2800 psi) and a two-hour vulcanization time. Vulcanization is the process by which natural rubber is strengthened by cross-linking the different polymer chains, with either elemental sulfur bridges or other molecules known as accelerators. However, high quality natural rubber was expensive, with a price exceeding $1.50 per pound. Diamond Rubber experimented with various additives, such as mercury iodide and aniline, in an attempt to improve the properties of lower quality rubber. The addition of only 2.5 to 6 percent of these additives improved the tensile strength of low quality rubber from 1800 psi to 2800 psi, and shortened the vulcanization time to a 90 minutes. However, these additives were detrimental to the lifetime of the rubber. In 1912, Spence was working with George Oenslager at Diamond Rubber to discover different additives to overcome these shortcomings. Working off of Oenslager's aniline additives, Spence discovered that p-aminodimethylaniline was a far superior accelerator, requiring only 0.5 weight percent added to the vulcanization process, to vastly improve the tensile strength of the rubber. P-aminodimethylaniline was adopted as the accelerator of choice by the Diamond Rubber Company in 1912.

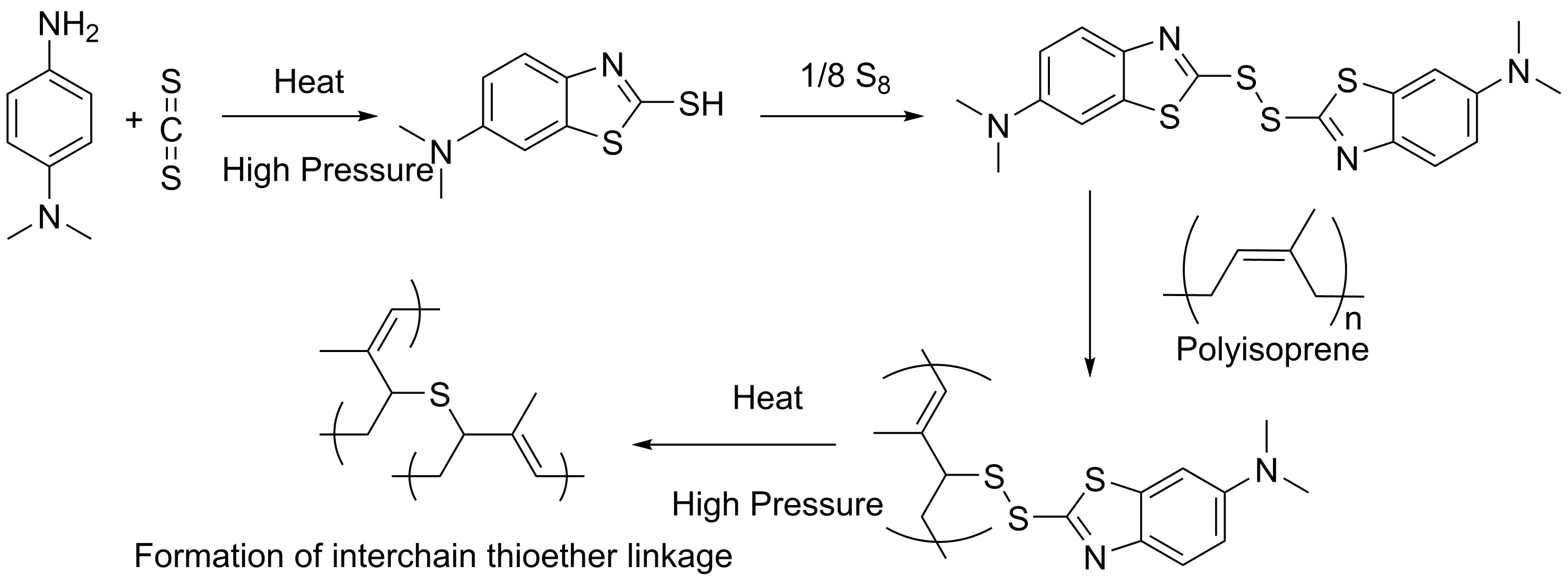
Traditional sulfur dependent vulcanization with para-aminodimethylaniline as an accelerator

=== Development of guayule as a rubber alternative ===
Throughout World War II, the allied forces suffered from a shortage of latex rubber, due to Japan cutting off America's access to the Malaysian rubber plantations. Spence, along with other allied scientists, scrambled to secure another natural rubber resource. Latex derived from Parthenium argentatum, more commonly called Guayule, was an ideal candidate as a replacement rubber due to the properties of the vulcanized rubber produced from Guayule, which were similar to the rubber produced from Malaysian rubber plantations. Latex from Guayule was first prepared in 1876, via a solvent extraction of the latex using acetone, and this extraction process was used commercially by the Diamond Rubber Company up until the 1930s. However, the acetone extraction process was too expensive to meet the large rubber demand brought on by World War II, creating a push to develop more conventional mechanical processing methods to extract the latex. A significant production challenge in the production of latex from Guayule was that both the mass of the latex extracted, and the tensile strength of latex, fell off due to the long storage time between the harvesting of the Guayule and its processing. Spence was tasked by Intercontinental Rubber to solve this challenge.

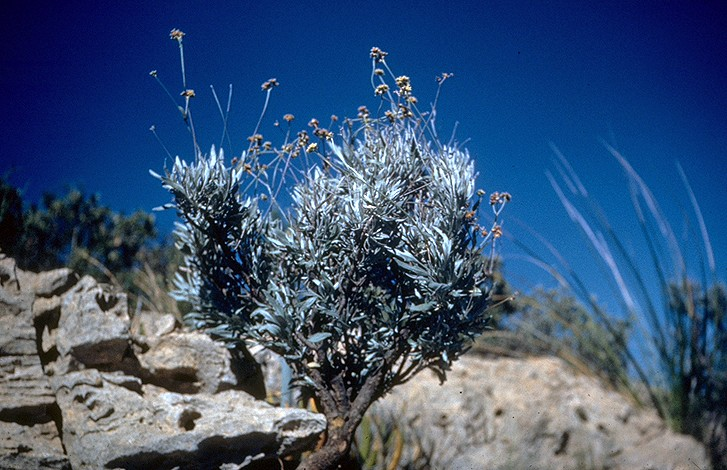
Guayule Shrub

Spence patented methodologies to both improve the quality and yield of rubber produced from Guayule via conventional mechanical techniques in 1933. Upon investigation, Spence determined that the drying of the Guayule was responsible for the high variability in both the yield and quality of the latex. Spence's retting processes of handling the Guayule shrub increased both the uniformity of the yield and the quality of rubber extracted from the Guayule plant. The retting process included soaking a crushed Guayule plant in a 1% para-dimethylphenylamine solution, in order for natural occurring bacteria and enzymes to decompose unwanted plant material into water-soluble by-products, and to prevent the oxidative loss of the plant's natural rubber. These by-products could then be washed away during the milling process. The retting process improved the milling extraction process of Guayule upwards of six percent, and improved the tensile strength from 1800-2000 psi upwards of 2800 psi, a tensile strength comparable to that of the rubber trees.

=== Synthetic production of isoprene ===
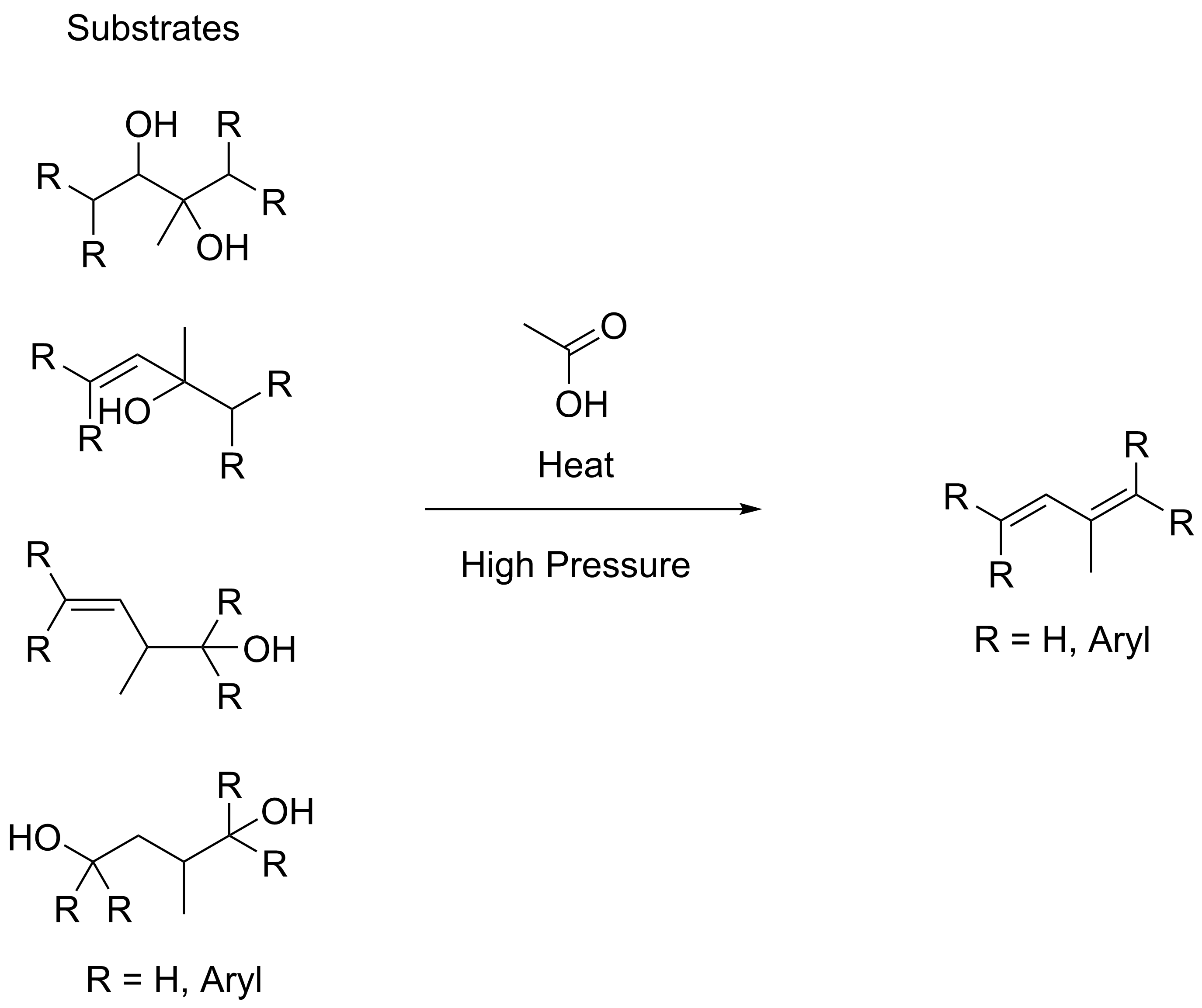
Synthetic route for the production of the isoprene monomer from various starting materials

Unfortunately the rubber from the Guayule plant did not satisfy the American demand for rubber. Even though President Franklin D. Roosevelt had stockpiled roughly 1 million tons of rubber, the annual U.S. consumption rate was 600 thousand tons of rubber. Therefore, additional rubber supplies were needed in order to avert a rubber shortage. This would present a serious vulnerability in the American war machine, as rubber was used to manufacture a wide variety of war materials. President Roosevelt commissioned the American rubber and petroleum industries to quickly design and implement synthetic rubber replacements, leading to rapid expansion of both these industries. To solve the rubber shortage, Spence and scientists from Goodyear, Firestone, Goodrich, and New Jersey Standard, joined together under a patent sharing agreement. The goals of the synthetic rubber project were to either synthetically produce the isoprene monomer, or combine multiple monomers to produce a suitable synthetic substitute for rubber. Spence, together with Dr. Alexander Clark, provided a method for producing synthetic isoprene, via the dehydration of 2,3 dimethylbut-1-en-3-ol and other alcohols using glacial acetic acid. Due to his involvement in the synthesis of the isoprene monomer, Spence was the first recipient of the Charles Goodyear Medal.

=== The development of a novel vulcanization and dyeing process for rubber products ===
While working at Goodyear, Spence altered the processes for vulcanization and the application of colored dyes to rubber. Traditionally, vulcanization was accomplished in air, with sulfur and other accelerators. While observing devulcanization, Spence noticed that the decomposition products were dependent on the oxygen content in the system, and that, without oxygen, the rubber failed to devulcanize. Based on these observations, Spence developed an oxygen, sulfur, and accelerator free vulcanization process by using organic oxidizers such as quinones or organic peroxides. Spence's vulcanization process required placing the latex mixture in a pH 7 buffered solution, and applying an organic oxidizer agent to the mixture under an inert atmosphere of nitrogen.

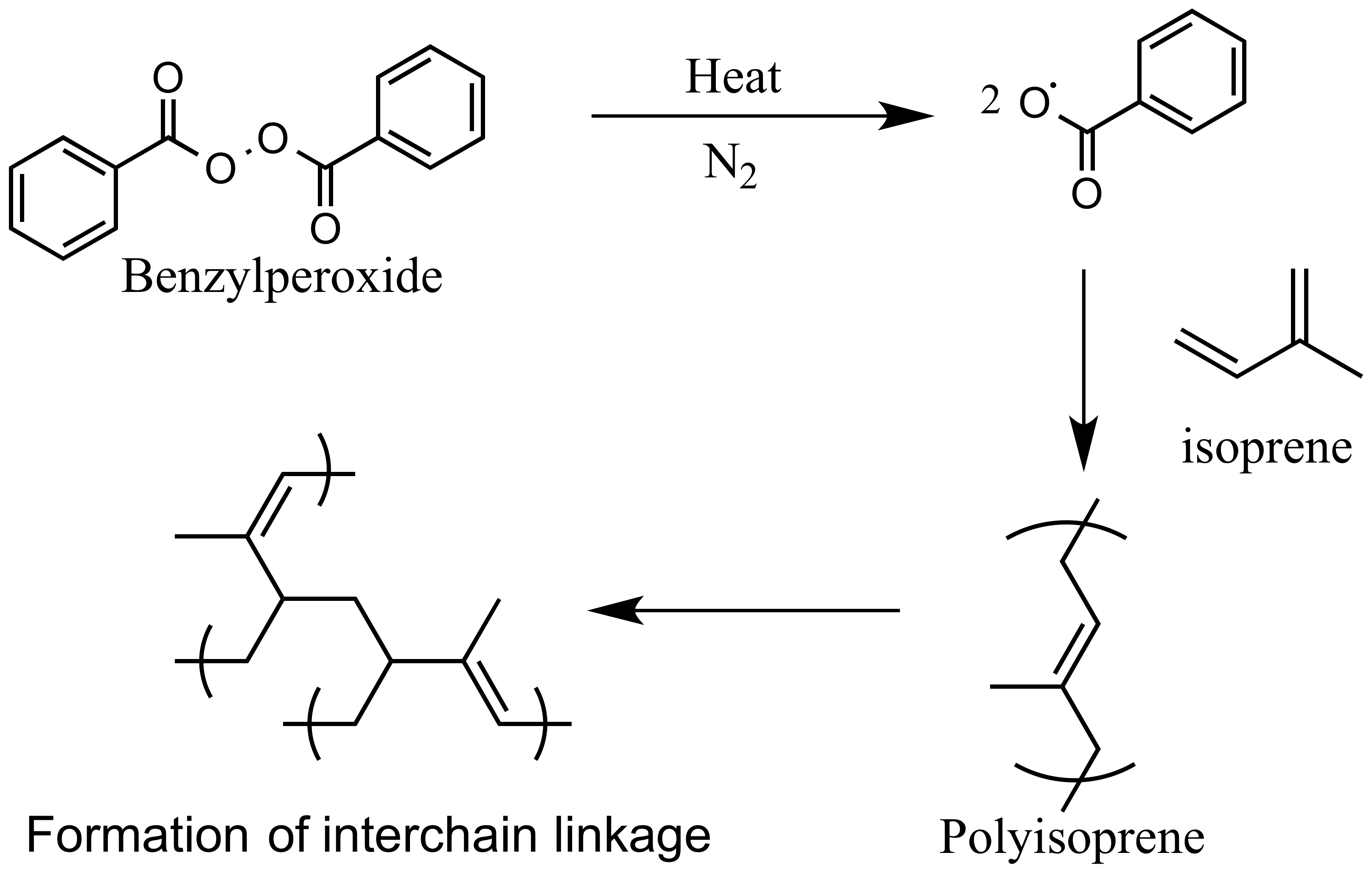
Anaerobic Vulcanization via benzylperoxide

In addition to redeveloping the vulcanization process, Spence developed a method for applying dyes to raw rubber. Prior to Spence's method, the dyes were applied during the processing of the rubber. This proved too expensive and was limited by thermal decomposition of the dyes. Submerging the rubber products in an adsorbent bath of amine dye, sodium hydrate, sodium chloride, and sulfuric acid allowed for the dyes to be bound covalently to the rubber matrix. The amines in solution reacted with primary amines in the rubber matrix to form azo dyes on the rubber fibers. This methodology of dyeing rubber was found to be applicable to raw, vulcanized, and other manufactured rubber products.
