= Arthur W. Carpenter =

American chemist

Arthur W. Carpenter (1891 – 2 January 1981) was a B. F. Goodrich chemist known for his contributions in standardizing testing methods for rubber.

Carpenter was born in Akron, Ohio in 1891, and he was a veteran of World War I. He obtained a master's degree from MIT in 1913 in chemical engineering. He joined B. F. Goodrich in 1926. From 1928 to 1956, he served as secretary of ASTM's standing committee on rubber. He served as president of ASTM in 1946. He served for a year on the War Production Board in 1951. He retired from Goodrich in 1957.

Carpenter won the 1957 Charles Goodyear Medal.
