= Herman E. Schroeder =

American research chemist (1915-2009)

Herman E. Schroeder (6 July 1915 – 28 November 2009) was a research director at DuPont, inventor of the first practical adhesive for bonding rubber to nylon for B29 bomber tires, and a pioneer in the development of specialty elastomers.

== Early life and education ==
Schroder was born in Brooklyn, New York on July 6, 1915. He attended Harvard University, where he received his bachelor's and master's degrees in chemistry in 1936 and 1937 and his Ph.D. in organic chemistry in 1939.

== Awards ==
In 1984, Schroeder received the Charles Goodyear Medal. DuPont awarded him the Lavoisier Medal for Inspirational Research Leadership in 1992.

== Publications ==
Thermoplastic Elastomers, 2nd Edition. ISBN 9781569902059.

== Death ==
He died in 2009 in Greenville, Delaware.
