= George S. Whitby =

American academic (1887–1972)

George Stafford Whitby (1887–1972) was the head of the University of Akron rubber laboratory and for many years was the only person in the United States who taught rubber chemistry. Whitby received the Charles Goodyear Medal in 1954 and was inducted into the International Rubber Science Hall of Fame in 1972. In 1986, the Rubber Division established the George Stafford Whitby Award in his honor.

== Personal ==
Whitby was born in Hull, England on May 23, 1887. He immigrated to the United States in 1942, becoming an American citizen in 1946. He died at Delray Beach, Florida on January 10, 1972.

== Education ==
Whitby received the BS degree in 1907 from the Royal College of Science in London. He obtained MS and PhD degrees from McGill University in 1918 and 1920.

== Career ==
Upon completing his undergraduate education in 1907, Whitby served as a chemist for the Societe Financiere des Caoutchoucs in Malaysia. After completing his graduate education, he accepted an appointment as a full professor at McGill University in 1923. In 1929, he accepted a position as director of the chemical division of the National Chemical Research Council of Canada. He joined the University of Akron faculty in 1942, and retired in 1954. His most cited work was an investigation of emulsifier-free polymerization in aqueous media.

== Awards ==
- 1928 - Colwyn medal
- 1954 - Charles Goodyear Medal
- 1972 - Inducted into the International Rubber Science Hall of Fame.
