= Herbert A. Winkelmann =

American chemist

Herbert A. Winklemann (3 May 1893- 2 June 1965) was a chemist at B. F. Goodrich, known as a co-inventor (with Harold Gray) of the first antioxidant, AgeRite, developed in 1924 and marketed for rubber. He wrote an early account of rubber recycling, and he studied the mitigation of ozone cracking. He held 48 patents in the field of rubber technology, retiring as Technical Director at Dryden Rubber Co.

== Biography ==
Winkelmann was born on 3 May 1893 in Swift County, Minnesota. He attended public schools in Appleton, Minnesota, graduating in 1910. He completed his undergraduate education in 1914 at North-Western College. He received a scholarship to the University of Illinois, where he completed a master's degree in chemistry in 1915. He continued as a graduate assistant at the University of Illinois for 3 years before resigning to enter military service. From 1917-1919 he was stationed at American University Experiment Station in Washington, D.C., and at Lakehurst Proving Ground in Lakehurst, New Jersey, completing his military service at the rank of captain in the Chemical Warfare Service. He then returned to the University of Illinois to complete his doctorate in 1919, entitled "The determination of organic compounds in low concentrations". His Ph.D. thesis advisor was George D. Beal.

Winkelmann's first patent, with co-inventor Harold Gray, was obtained in 1921 during his employment with B. F. Goodrich. He was later employed by Philadelphia Rubber Works, Marbon Corp. and by Dryden Rubber Company.

== Awards ==
Winklemann was the 1961 recipient of the Charles Goodyear Medal.
