= Ivan Ostromislensky =

Russian chemist (1880–1939)

- Born: 9 September 1880; Oryol, Russia
- Died: 16 January 1939 (aged 58); New York City, United States
- Known for: Development of synthetic rubber
- Scientific career
- Fields: Chemistry, pharmacy
- Institutions: Russia, US

Ivan Ivanovich Ostromislensky (Russian: Иван Иванович Остромысленский, also Iwan Ostromislensky) (9 September 1880 – 16 January 1939) was a Russian organic chemist. He is credited as the pioneer in studying polymerization of synthetic rubber as well as inventor of various industrial technologies for production of synthetic rubber, polymers and pharmaceuticals.

== Early life ==
Ostromislensky was born in Oryol, Russia to a family of a nobleman, a poruchik of elite corps. He received his education first at the Moscow cadet corps and then, from 1898 to 1902 at the Moscow Technical School. After graduation, in April 1902, Ostromislensky went to Germany, and enrolled to the Technical School in Karlsruhe. There, he specialized in physical chemistry, organic chemistry and electrochemistry. In July 1906 he returned to Russia and in February 1907 was hired at the Moscow State University (MSU) as an assistant in the laboratory of inorganic and physical chemistry, led by Professor Sabaneev. In 1909, Ostromislensky became a privatdozent of MSU. During his work at MSU, he actively collaborated with Professor L. Chugayev, who headed the laboratory of organic and general chemistry, and started his work on synthetic rubber.

In 1912 after an internal quarrel, Ostromislensky resigned from the MSU. He continued his work on rubber (1912–1917) at Bogatyr (Russian: Богатырь), which was Russia's main rubber company. The company director showed great interest in the emerging synthetic rubber and readily financed the work of Ostromislensky, who was the pioneer of synthetic rubber in Russia.

In 1905 Ostromislensky started reporting his research on the polymerization of dienes and on the synthesis of the starting monomers for synthetic rubber. He had patented more than 20 ways to produce butadiene (buta-1,3-diene), which were implemented industrially in the Soviet Union. The butadiene production method, which was based on aldol condensation of acetaldehyde (1905), was also implemented on industrial scale in Germany in 1936. Another method was based on passing vapors of ethanol and acetaldehyde at 440–460°C over aluminium oxide (1915) and received industrial use in 1942–1943 in the United States. In 1915 Ostromislensky also synthesized isoprene via pyrolysis of turpentine and polymerized it using light. Ostromislensky pioneered the studies of non-sulfur activators of vulcanization of rubber. He also proposed organic additions to rubber, such as toluidine and naphthylamine, in order to improve its properties. Those additives were later exploited by US companies, such as Union Carbide.

In 1913 Ostromislensky published a book on "Rubber and its analogs", which was the first Russian textbook on chemistry and technology of rubber. It summarized most available bibliography on the subject, including foreign patents which were inaccessible to most Russian readers. The book also described 16 original methods of industrial synthesis and polymerization of dialkenes (alkadienes).

In 1910s Ostromislensky also started shifting his attention toward biochemical, immunochemical and pharmaceutical research, as indicated by that he had two doctoral degrees from University of Zurich, in philosophy and medicine. In 1913, he started his own company named "private chemical and bacteriological laboratory". There he performed a number of studies on the immunological specificity and chemical nature of antibodies and antigens and published the results in the Journal of Physical and Chemical Society in 1915. Ostromislensky investigated the possibility of synthesis of antibodies in vitro and proposed a theory of antibody synthesis, which is regarded as one of the first versions of the so-called matrix theory of antibody synthesis. The theory had strong influence on the development of immunochemistry, but was later proven incorrect. Medical interests of Ostromislensky are also illustrated by his essay on "dream in humans and animals", which examined the toxicological, immunological and physiological aspects of a dream. He considered sleep as a process of self-poisoning by some toxin, which shortens the lifetime.

Between 1918 and 1920, Ostromislensky headed a chemical therapeutic laboratory of the Chemical-Pharmaceutical Institute in Moscow. There he studied the structure and properties of the popular foreign drug Salvarsan and developed the method of manufacturing a domestic analogue called Arsol. Arsol was based on relatively cheap production of colloidal arsenic that was important in the time of the Civil Wars and economic crisis in Russia.

== Life abroad ==
In October 1921 Ostromislensky left Russia and moved to Latvia. There he assumed a position of assistant professor at the department of organic chemistry of University of Latvia in Riga. There he taught two major courses, on chemistry of rubber and on chemotherapeutic drugs. In May 1922 at the invitation of Dr. A. Hopkinson from the US "Rubber Company" Ostromislensky moved to New York. There he continued his work on chemistry and technology of rubber and pharmaceuticals in two companies, United States Rubber Company and Goodyear Tire and Rubber Company. In 1925 he opened his "Ostro Research Laboratory", where he studied the pharmaceutical properties of various compounds based on arsenic and vegetable oils which were used to treat leprosy. He also advocated commercial production of chemotherapeutic drugs pyridium and pyrazolone. In 1928 he received a US patent for production of polystyrene which was used by US Rubber for the first commercial production of polystyrene in the early 1930s. He also patented his early work on the synthesis of polyvinyl chloride in the US.

In 1930 Ostromislensky received U.S. citizenship and was invited to work in the company Union Carbide to develop commercial production of butadiene from ethanol. The production ceased only after the World War II, because it could not compete with butylene-based technologies. In the US, Ostromislensky improved several industrial technologies of synthetic rubber production. He also developed a technology for producing safety glass for the automobile windshields.

In one of developed by him reactions, ethanol is oxidized to acetaldehyde, which reacts with additional ethanol over a tantalum-promoted porous silica catalyst at 325–350°C to yield butadiene:

CH_{3}CH_{2}OH + CH_{3}CHO → CH_{2}=CH-CH=CH_{2} + 2 H_{2}O
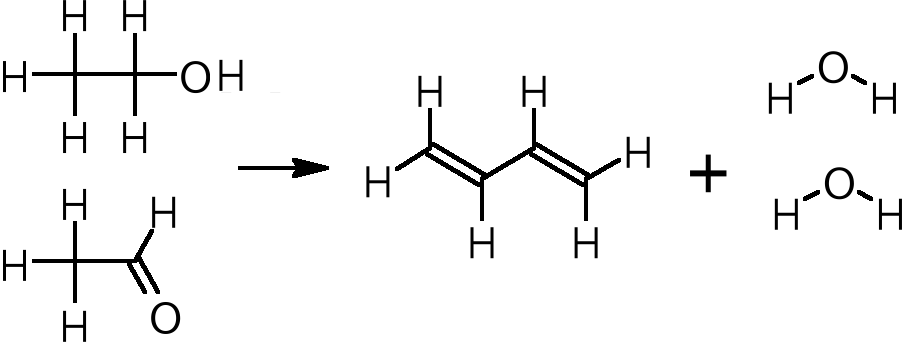

This process was used in the United States to produce government rubber during World War II, and remains in use today in China and India.

== Death and legacy ==
Ostromislensky died at the age 58. His scientific work did not receive appropriate recognition during his lifetime, but was widely praised afterwards. He was among the first 5 scientists inducted into the International Rubber Science Hall of Fame.
