= Arnold M. Collins =

Arnold Miller Collins (1899-1982) was a chemist at DuPont who, working under Elmer Bolton and Wallace Carothers with Ira Williams, first isolated polychloroprene and 2-chloro-1,3-butadiene in 1930.

== Personal ==
Collins was born 1899, married Helen Clark Collins, and died on October 8, 1982.

== Education ==
Collins attended Columbia College, graduating in 1921 with the AB degree.

Collins obtained a doctoral degree from Columbia College in 1924. His dissertation was entitled "Electrolytic introduction of alkyl groups", Columbia University, New York, New York.

== Career ==
At Dupont, Collins worked under Wallace Carothers. Carothers assigned Collins to produce a sample of divinylacetylene. In March 1930, while distilling the products of the acetylene reaction, Collins obtained a small quantity of an unknown liquid, which he put aside in stoppered test tubes. He later found that the liquid had congealed into a clear homogeneous mass. When Collins removed the mass from the test tube, it bounced. Further analysis showed that the mass was a polymer of chloroprene, formed with chlorine from the cuprous chloride catalyst. Collins had stumbled upon a new synthetic rubber.

Following this breakthrough, DuPont began to manufacture its first artificial rubber, DuPrene, in September 1931. In 1936, it was renamed neoprene a term to be used generically.

== Awards and Recognitions ==
- 1973 - Charles Goodyear Medal from the ACS Rubber Division
