= Joseph Kuczkowski =

Joseph A. Kuczkowski is a retired Goodyear scientist, noted for successfully explaining the mechanisms of antioxidant and antiozonant function, and for commercial development of new antiozonant systems and improvement of the stability of polymeric materials.

== Education ==
- 1963 - BS Chemistry, Canisius College, Buffalo, New York
- 1966 - MS Chemistry, Canisius College, Buffalo, New York
- 1968 - Ph.D. Organic Chemistry, Wayne State University, Detroit, Michigan, supervised by Prof. Michael P. Cava
- 1971 - postdoctoral fellow under Prof. Adam M. Aguiar in organo-phosphorus chemistry

== Career ==
- 1968-1970 - U.S. Army Medical Service Corps, responsible for Clinical Chemistry Department of the 6th US Army Medical Laboratory
- 1971 - jointed Goodyear Tire & Rubber Company as a Senior Research Chemist
- 1977 - Section Head, exploratory products and processes
- 1982 - Section Head, Rubber Chemicals
- 1984 - Section Head, Rubber Chemicals & Hydroquinone
- 1988 - R&D Associate, Chemicals and Specialty Polymers
- 2001 - retired from Goodyear

Kuczkowsi holds 23 US patents. Of these, 12 are products or processes in production, including: Wingstay SN and Wingstay K.

== Awards ==
- 2000 - Melvin Mooney Award of the Rubber Division of the American Chemical Society.
- 2011 - Charles Goodyear Medal of the Rubber Division of the American Chemical Society.
