= Gert Heinrich =

German physicist (born 1950)

Gert Heinrich (born 13 December 1950) is a German physicist, materials scientist and TU Dresden university lecturer. He is known for contributions to "statistical-mechanical and constitutive continuum theory, molecular dynamics, friction theory and fracture mechanics" of polymers.

== Education ==
Gert Heinrich was born on 13 December 1950 in Plauen, East Germany. He grew up in Pausa and in 1969, after graduating from high school and completing his skilled work as a bricklayer, began studying physics at the Friedrich Schiller University in Jena, which he completed in 1973 with his diploma thesis in the department of "Applied Quantum Theory" under Gerhard Weber on the topic of "On the theory of multiphoton processes in strong electromagnetic fields". He then worked as a scientific assistant and senior assistant in the physics section at the Carl Schorlemmer Technical University of Leuna-Merseburg (THLM). He received his doctorate in the field of theoretical physics under the supervision of Günter Helmis in 1978 on the topic of "Mechanical properties of polymer networks taking into account the impenetrability of the network chains".

In 1984 he obtained the Facultas Docendi in theoretical physics and in 1985 he qualified as a professor with his thesis "Development and application of a theory of polymer networks and melting under molecular field theoretical consideration of topology conservation".

== Career ==
In 1987 he was appointed full professor of theoretical physics at the THLM. From 1987 to 1988 he worked as a visiting scientist at Charles University and at the Institute of Macromolecular Chemistry of the Academy of Sciences of the CSSR in Prague.

From 1990 to 2002 he worked as a senior research scientist and head of the materials research department in the central areas of tire research and strategic technology at Continental AG, Hanover.

From 1991 to 1996 he also taught "Physics and Technology of Polymers" at the Gottfried Wilhelm Leibniz University of Hanover at the Institute of Macromolecular Chemistry, and from 2002 to 2005 "Elastomer Materials and Testing" at the Martin Luther University of Halle-Wittenberg.

From 2003 to 2016 he was C4(W3) Professor for Polymer Materials and Elastomer Technology at the Faculty of Mechanical Engineering at the Technical University of Dresden and at the same time director of the Institute of Polymer Materials at the Leibniz Institute for Polymer Research Dresden e. V. until 2017. Since then he has worked as a research senior professor at the TU Dresden.

In 2009 he turned down an offer of a W3 professorship for "Micro- and Nanostructure-Based Polymer Composites" at the Martin Luther University Halle/Wittenberg and the Fraunhofer Institute for Mechanics of Materials (IWM) Halle/S.

From 2005 to 2012 he was an elected member of the Chemistry/Polymer Sciences Review Board of the German Research Foundation (DFG). At the same time he headed the DFG-funded research group FOR 597 "Statistical Mechanics and Fracture Mechanics of Rubbers".

Gert Heinrich is the author and co-author of over 800 scientific articles, patents and books on the physics and theory of polymer networks, on mechanical reinforcement, production and processing of polymer materials and elastomers, composite materials, rubber technology, friction and wear of elastomers, and the physics and technology of car and truck tires. He founded the research field "Rubberiomics" as a concept for holistic research approaches to elastomers.

He also works as a consultant for companies in the polymer and tire industry. From 2005 to 2015 he organized international conferences on the research and development of automobile tires in Dresden. From 2007 to 2016 he organized regular seminars for doctoral students and visiting scientists in Pausa/Vogtland, as well as annual discussion forums at the same location since 1990, including: with the publicist, teacher and political activist Wolfgang Mayer and the physicist, university lecturer and founder of the company Supracon AG (Jena) Hans-Georg Meyer.

== Awards ==
- 2015 - Colwyn Medal of Institute of Materials, Minerals and Mining (IOM³), London/UK
- 2015 - George Stafford Whitby Award (American Chemical Society, Rubber Division, USA)
- 2015 - Carl-Dietrich-Harries Medal of the German Rubber Society
- 2017 - Lifetime Achievement Award, awarded by Tire Technology International Magazine
- 2024 - H.F. Mark Medal, Austrian Research Institute for Chemistry and Technology
- 2024 – Charles Goodyear Medal of the Rubber Division of the American Chemical Society.
