= James D. D'Ianni =

American polymer scientist (1914–2007)

- Born: March 11, 1914; Akron, Ohio
- Died: August 14, 2007 (aged 93); Akron, Ohio
- Education: University of Wisconsin
- Known for: Development of synthetic rubber
- Awards: Charles Goodyear Medal (1977)
- Scientific career
- Fields: Polymer science
- Workplaces: Goodyear Tire & Rubber Company

James Daniel D'Ianni (1914–2007) was a scientist at the Goodyear Tire & Rubber Company noted for his contributions to the development of synthetic rubber.

D'Ianni spent his career with Goodyear, except for a leave he took in 1946 to serve as chief of the polymer research branch of the Office of Rubber Reserve. In 1978, he retired from Goodyear as Director of Research.

D'Ianni was a member of the American Chemical Society (ACS) and the National Academy of Sciences. He served as president of ACS in 1980 and as head of its rubber division. He was the first ACS President to travel to China in that capacity. In 1977, the ACS Rubber Division honored D'Ianni with the Charles Goodyear Medal.

== Personal life ==
D'Ianni was born in Akron, Ohio on March 11, 1914. He married Dorothy Osterstock, also from Akron, in 1940. He died on August 14, 2007, in Akron, at age 93.

== Education ==
- B.S., Chemistry, The University of Akron, 1934
- Ph.D., Organic Chemistry, University of Wisconsin, 1938, under advisor Homer Adkins.
- Six-week Advanced Management Program, Harvard Business School
