= Karl A. Grosch =

Industry scientist

Dr. Karl Alfred Grosch (1923-2012) was a rubber industry scientist noted for his contributions to understanding tire friction and abrasion. Dr. Grosch is the developer of the LAT 100 Abrasion tester that is used widely in the tire industry to evaluate the friction and wear properties of rubber compounds.

== Personal ==
Grosch was born in Trannroda, today An der Heide 11, 07387 Krölpa/Trannroda Thuringia, Germany, on February 16, 1923, died July 15, 2012.

Grosch served in the German military during World War II, and was captured by the British as a prisoner of war.

== Education ==
He received a B.S. (Special Physics) from the University of London in 1958, and a Ph.D. (Science) from the school in 1963 under the supervision of David Tabor of Cambridge and L.R.G. Treloar of Manchester University with the title Friction and abrasion of rubber.

== Career ==
In 1955, Grosch started his career as a research assistant at the MRPRA, under Adolf Schallamach. Grosch helped establish that rolling friction and grip on dry roads are governed by the viscoelastic properties of rubber. In 1963, he was named principal scientific officer.

In 1969, Grosch joined Uniroyal in Germany, working there until his retirement in 1988.

After retirement, he developed the LAT 100 laboratory friction and abrasion tester, which is marketed by VMI Holland BV in the Netherlands.

== Awards ==
Grosch received the 2007 Charles Goodyear Medal of the Rubber Division of the American Chemical Society, and the 1997 Colwyn medal from the Institute of Materials.
