= Michael P. Cava =

American organic chemist (1926–2010)

- Born: February 13, 1926; Brooklyn, New York, United States
- Died: September 29, 2010 (aged 84); Brookline, Massachusetts, United States
- Education: Harvard University (BS); University of Michigan (MS, PhD)
- Scientific career
- Fields: Organic chemistry
- Workplaces: University of Alabama; University of Pennsylvania; Wayne State University; Ohio State University
- Doctoral advisor: Werner Emmanuel Bachmann
- Other academic advisors: André Dreiding
- Doctoral students: Joseph Kuczkowski

Michael Patrick Cava (13 February 1926 – 29 September 2010) was an American organic chemist and the Ramsay Professor Emeritus of Chemistry at the University of Alabama.

== Biography ==
Cava was born in Brooklyn, New York, on 13 February 1926 to Italian parents. As a child, he tried chemical experiments at home with his friend Jerrold Meinwald. He graduated from Harvard University in 1946 and then earned his MS and PhD from the University of Michigan in 1948 and 1951, respectively. His doctoral supervisor was Werner Emmanuel Bachmann, who died during his studies. He then continued his research with the help of André Dreiding.

He conducted research as a postdoctoral fellow with Robert Burns Woodward at Harvard University for two years. He then took up a position as an assistant professor at Ohio State University, where he was promoted to full professor in 1965. In 1965, he transferred to Wayne State University. He worked at the University of Pennsylvania from 1969 to 1985. In 1985, he was appointed to the Ramsay Chair of Chemistry at the University of Alabama, where he remained until his retirement in 2004.

During his career, he served a visiting professor at the University of Illinois in 1957 and the University of California at Santa Barbara in 1968. He was also a Raman Visiting professor at the University of Madras in 1973.

He was an emeritus member of the American Chemical Society. He was also a Sloan Fellow from 1958 to 1962 and a Guggenheim Fellow from 1984 to 1985. He died on 29 September 2010 in Brookline, Massachusetts, at the age of 84.

== Research ==
His research focused on synthetic organic chemistry including cyclobutadiene derivatives, biological compounds, organic conductors, conductive polymers, and nonlinear optical materials.

In 1978, he and his collaborators reported the synthesis of bis(ethylenedithio)tetrathiafulvalene (BEDT-TTF), whose charge transfer complexs have yielded the numerous organic superconductors.

== Personal ==
He married his first wife, Esther Laden of Duluth, Minnesota, in 1951. An expert in adolescent psychology, she died in 1995. Their son, John, became an architect in Portland, Oregon. He is survived by his second wife, Armelle Guinard; his son, John; and his granddaughter, Sophie Rose.

== Selected Publications ==
- Allinger, Norman L.; Cava, Michael P.; De Jongh, Don C.; Johnson, Carl R.; Lebel, Norman A.; Stevens, Calvin L. (1974). Organic chemistry. Worth Publications Inc. ISBN 9780879010157.
