= Samuel E. Horne Jr. =

Samuel Emmett Horne Jr. (July 26, 1924 –February 4, 2006) was a research scientist at B. F. Goodrich noted for first synthesizing cis-1,4-polyisoprene, the main polymer contained in natural tree rubber, using Ziegler catalysis. Earlier attempts to produce synthetic rubber from isoprene had been unsuccessful, but in 1955, Horne prepared 98 percent cis-1,4-polyisoprene via the stereospecific polymerization of isoprene. The product of this reaction differs from natural rubber only slightly. It contains a small amount of cis-1,2-polyisoprene, but it is indistinguishable from natural rubber in its physical properties.

== Personal ==
Horne was born July 26, 1924, in Jacksonville, Florida. He grew up in Tampa, Florida. He married Sue Ross in 1949. They had four children.

He showed interest in chemistry at a young age. When he was five or six years old, he and a friend played with a chemistry set. Although the experiments sometimes led to unpleasant odors and other problems, his parents nevertheless encouraged the young Horne to pursue his interest in chemistry.

Horne died on February 4, 2006, in Columbus, Ohio.

== Education and career ==
Horne graduated from Tampa's Henry B. Plant High School in 1942. He enrolled at Emory University, but his university studies were interrupted by World War II. He joined the U.S. Navy in July 1943 and served until 1946. He was released to inactive status with the rank of Lieutenant (JG).

He returned to Emory University, where he obtained his A.B. degree in 1947, his M.A. degree in 1948, and his Ph.D. degree in 1950. After graduating, Horne took a job at the B. F. Goodrich Company's Research and Development Center in Brecksville, Ohio in 1950. He remained with B.F Goodrich until it sold its rubber research division to the Canadian company Polysar in 1982. He retired from Polysar in 1987.

== Research ==
=== Synthetic polyisoprene ===
In 1954, Hornse was given the assignment of testing catalysts that B. F. Goodrich had licensed from Karl Ziegler. After verifying the claims for the polymerization of ethylene, and also for other alpha-olefins, Horne copolymerized ethylene with other olefins as a means of controlling the polyethylene density. With the success of the copolymerizations, he decided to try to copolymerize ethylene with isoprene with the thought of getting a copolymer that could be vulcanized with sulfur in a typical rubber recipe. While Ziegler had reported no success in polymerizing dienes, Horne attempted to copolymerize ethylene with isoprene which resulted in a mixture of cis-1,4-polyisoprene and polyethylene.

== Awards ==
In 1969, he was chairman of the Gordon Conference on Hydrocarbon Chemistry. In 1974, he received the Pioneer Award from the American Institute of Chemists. In 1978, he received the Midgley Medal from the Detroit Section of the American Chemical Society. In 1980, he received the Charles Goodyear Medal. And in 1982, he received an Honorary Doctor of Science from Emory University.
