= Adolf Schallamach =

Scientist

Adolf Schallamach (1905–1997) was a scientist at the British Rubber Producers' Research Association noted for pioneering understanding of the mechanisms of rubber friction. He was one of only two electrical engineers ever to win the Charles Goodyear Medal (the other being Fernley H. Banbury).

== Personal ==
Schallamach was born in 1905 in Posen, German Empire (now Poznań, Poland). He died on 22 June 1997. He is one of 2820 people named in the 'Black Book', the popularized name of the Nazi Sonderfahndungsliste GB' (e/special/ly most wanted list), for arrest after a successful Nazi invasion of Britain in 1940.

== Education ==
In 1929 Schallamach received his Diplom Ingenieur in electrical engineering, having studied at technical high schools in Zurich and Breslau. He completed his doctoral dissertation at the University of Breslau in 1934 but had to leave Germany as a Jewish refugee before receiving his degree. He was only able to receive his doctorate officially in 1948 from the University of Braunschweig after Breslau had become Polish.

== Career ==
After immigrating to the United Kingdom, Schallamach obtained a position at the Davy Faraday Laboratory of the Royal Institution, researching crystal structure at low temperatures. He held this position from 1934 until 1943.

In 1943, he joined the British Rubber Producers' Research Association as a Research Physicist. He initially studied the dielectric properties of elastomers, but soon was called on to pursue studies into the friction and abrasion properties of rubber. His developments included a viscoelastic theory of friction that explained the observed rate dependence of rubber friction in terms of molecular arguments.

== Schallamach Waves ==
Schallamach is widely known for his observation of the occurrence of waves of detachment during abrasion experiments with rubber. He provided an explanation for these Schallamach waves in terms of the elastic instability of the elastomer surface.

== Awards ==
- 1942 - Fellow of the Institute of Physics.
- 1998 - inducted into the International Rubber Science Hall of Fame.
- 1970 - Colwyn medal
- 1982 - Charles Goodyear Medal.

== Publications ==
Schallamach, Adolf (1948). Über die Temperaturabhängigkeit der Elektronenaustrittsarbeit und des lichtelektrischen Effekts reiner Metalloberflächen bei tiefen Temperaturen (in German).
