= Joseph C. Patrick =

American inventor of synthetic rubber and founder of Thiokol corp. (1892–1965)

Dr. Joseph Cecil Patrick (August 28, 1892 – April 12, 1965) invented Thiokol, America's first synthetic rubber in the early 1920s. While seeking a formulation for automotive antifreeze, he attempted to hydrolyze ethylene dichloride with sodium polysulfide. In doing so, he produced a brown, insoluble gum that later became known as Thiokol. He solved commercial production problems by inventing the suspension polymerization process, and solved compounding problems by degrading high molecular weight polymer to a low molecular weight liquid polymer. This material is one of the principal binders for rocket propellant. Patrick's most cited research publication treated the subject of high molecular weight polymers.

Patrick was the 1958 recipient of the Charles Goodyear Medal and the Elliot Cresson Medal of the Franklin Institute for discoveries in polysulfide polymers and new processes in manufacturing synthetic rubbers.
