= Robert M. Thomas =

American chemist and engineer (1908–1984)

Robert McKee Thomas (1908 – July 23, 1984) was a co-inventor of butyl rubber, along with William J. Sparks. Thomas held 75 patents, and directed the work of several notable polymer scientists including Francis P. Baldwin and Joseph Kennedy. He worked at the Standard Oil Company, in New Jersey, starting work in 1929 after obtaining a bachelor's degree in chemistry. He retired in 1965.

The ACS Rubber Division's Sparks-Thomas award is named after Thomas and Butyl rubber co-inventor William J. Sparks.

In 1969, he received the Charles Goodyear Medal.

Thomas was famously quoted by Joseph Kennedy for the advice Kennedy received as a young researcher from Thomas: "your project better be useful, otherwise your reward will be a cookie and a handshake".
