= John T. Blake =

American research scientist

John Twiss Blake (c. 1901 – June 26, 1987) was an American research scientist at the Simplex Wire and Cable company. in Boston, Massachusetts who, along with Charles R. Boggs, found that proteins present in natural rubber were responsible for water absorption. Blake and Boggs showed that the proteins could be isolated by repeated centrifugal action on liquid latex. In 1926 Simplex applied for a patent on the deproteinized rubber. This became the basis for a new product family of lightweight, moisture-proof Anhydrex-insulated power and communication cables. He made significant contributions to understanding various degradation mechanisms of rubber, including the effects of water absorption, exposure to light, ozone, and microbes.

Blake was born and educated in Boston. He graduated from Tufts College with honors in 1921 with a bachelor of science degree in chemical engineering and from the Massachusetts Institute of Technology in 1924 with a doctorate in organic chemistry and chemical engineering. His doctoral advisor was James F. Norris, and the title of his thesis was Rates of reaction of certain organic chlorine compounds.

After obtaining his doctoral degree, he worked at Simplex Wire and Cable Co., starting as a research chemist and eventually serving as senior vice president. Blake was an organizer and chairman of the Boston Rubber Group.

In 1953, Blake received the Charles Goodyear Medal.

Blake later received an honorary doctor of science degree from Tufts University in 1956, and a degree in advanced management.

He died on 26 June 1987 at age 86 in Hyannis, Massachusetts after a brief illness.
