= Lorin B. Sebrell =

American scientist (1894–1984)

Lorin Beryl Sebrell (19 November 1894 – 5 August 1984) was an American scientist at the Goodyear Tire and Rubber Co. noted for identifying mercaptobenzothiazole as a vulcanization accelerator. In 1942, Sebrell received the Charles Goodyear Medal.

== Early life and education ==
Sebrell was born on 19 November 1894 in Alliance, Ohio. In 1918, he married Ruth Ellen Tullis. He received his B.S. in chemistry from Mount Union College in 1916. After completing his M.S., he served in the Chemical Warfare Service during World War I. He obtained his Ph.D. in 1922 from Ohio State University after starting work at Goodyear in 1919.

== Career ==
In 1920 Sebrell isolated mercaptobenzothiazole, an important rubber vulcanization accelerator from various reactions. Although well known since the 1880s, Sebrell's insight was that it is generated in situ during the zinc-catalyzed vulcanization of rubber. He devised ways of producing mercaptothiazole on a commercial scale. The new accelerator was named Captax. Captax, which was vital in achieving durable truck-tire compounds, was placed on the market in 1926.

While at Goodyear, Sebrell held positions including Head of Organic Chemistry section, and Manager of Research in 1928. In 1933, Sebrell served as Chairman of the Rubber Division, ACS. During World War II, Sebrell worked on bullet-sealing fuel tanks. In 1944, Sebrell was director of research at Goodyear. In 1942, Sebrell became the second recipient of the Charles Goodyear Medal. His address was entitled The Second Mile and it discussed "the present status of the synthetic rubber situation".

In 1949, Sebrell left Goodyear to take a position as Director of research and development at International Latex Corporation in Dover, Delaware. He retired from this position in 1959.

Sebrell died in Hudson, Ohio on 5 August 1984 at the age of 89.
