= Georg Bohm (scientist) =

American polymer scientist and engineer

Georg Bohm is a retired Vice President of Research and Technology for Bridgestone Americas noted for the development of electron beam pre-curing of elastomers.

== Education ==
- BS Electrical Engineering, University of Vienna
- 1962 – Ph.D. Physics from University of Vienna in Austria

Between 1963 and 1967, he held scientific/academic positions at: the Max Planck Institute for Physical Chemistry in Gottingen, Germany, Seoul National University in Korea, the University of Bandung in Indonesia, and Northwestern University in Illinois.

== Career ==
- 1967 – Radiation Research Laboratories of Firestone Corp. in Westbury, New York
- 2005 – retired from Bridgestone Americas as VP Research and Technology
- 2010 – President of Appia LLC

Bohm's most cited work considered the effect on blend morphology of molecular weight, glass transition temperature, and composition for EPDM/BR blends.

== Awards ==
- 2016 – Charles Goodyear Medal of the Rubber Division of the American Chemical Society
