= Leo Mandelkern =

Leo Mandelkern (23 February 1922 – 31 May 2006) was a polymer chemist and professor known for his contributions to the understanding of polymer crystallization, and for his contributions to education.

== Personal ==
Mandelkern was born on February 23, 1922, in New York City. He was raised there, and attended public schools. He served as a meteorologist during World War II. He died on May 31, 2006.

== Education ==
- 1942 A.B., Chemistry, Cornell University
- 1949 Ph.D., Chemistry, Cornell University, supervised by Frank Long

== Career ==
- 1949 - 1952 Research Associate, Cornell University, supervised by Paul Flory
- 1952 - 1962 Physical Chemist, National Bureau of Standards
- 1962 - 2006 Professor of Chemistry, Florida State University
- 1970 - 1974 Associate Director, Institute of Molecular Biophysics, Florida State University

== Awards and recognition ==
- 1957 Medal Award for Meritorious Service, United States Department of Commerce, National Bureau of Standards
- 1958 Arthur S. Fleming Award, Washington DC Junior Chamber of Commerce
- 1975 Witco Award in Polymer Chemistry, American Chemical Society
- 1984 Florida Award, American Chemical Society, Lakeland, Florida
- 1984 Mettler Award, North American Thermal Analysis Society
- 1993 - Charles Goodyear Medal from the ACS Rubber Division
- 1994 - Paul J. Flory Polymer Education Award
