= William C. Geer =

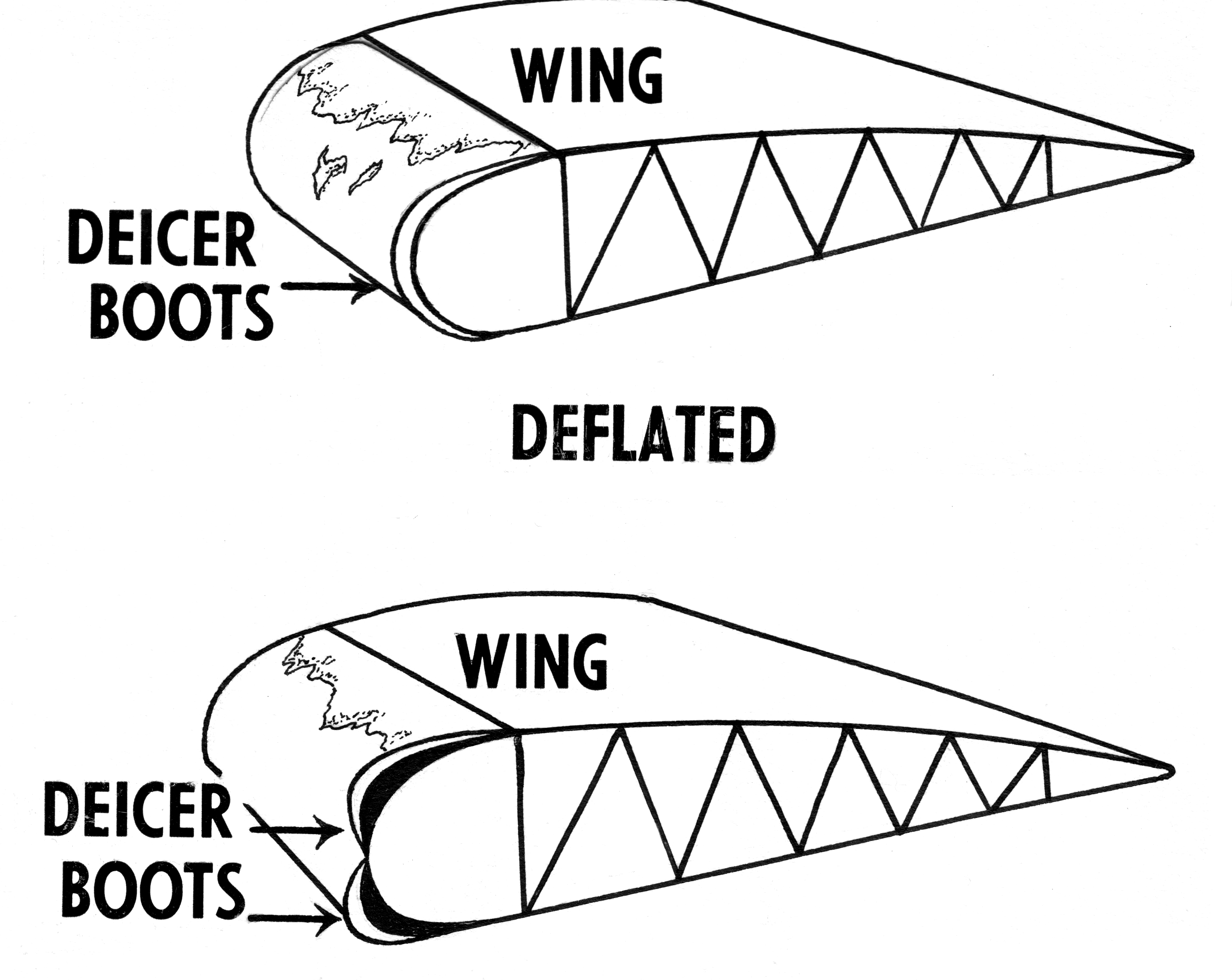
Operation of deicing boots

William C. Geer (1876 – 9 September 1964) was a B.F. Goodrich chemist and eventual Vice President of Research known for inventing the aircraft Deicing boot. Geer began working on the deicing problem in 1927. By 1929 the work showed enough promise that he won support from the Guggenheim fund, and by 1930 he had made the first flight test. He was able to persuade C. W. Leguillon of the B. F. Goodrich Tire and Rubber Company that his system worked, and a commitment to develop the device. He eventually held 40 patents on the deicing boot. He also developed golf ball cover materials and adhesives for bonding rubber to various substrates.

Geer was a native of Ogdensburg, New York. He received his doctorate in chemistry from Cornell University in 1905. He joined the B. F. Goodrich Rubber Company in 1907 as Chief Chemist. He became vice president of research in 1920, retiring in 1925 due to ill health. He authored the text "The Reign of Rubber" in 1922.

He won the 1951 Charles Goodyear Medal.
