= William J. Sparks =

American chemist (1905–1976)

- Born: February 26, 1905
- Died: October 23, 1976 (aged 71)
- Known for: co-inventor Butyl rubber
- Awards: Perkin Medal (1964); Charles Goodyear Medal (1966)
- Scientific career
- Fields: Polymer science
- Workplaces: Exxon

William Joseph Sparks (February 26, 1905 – October 23, 1976) was a chemist at Exxon. As an inventor, his most important contribution was the development of butyl rubber.

Sparks served as president of the American Chemical Society in 1966 and chairman of the National Research Council's Division of Chemistry and Technology from July 1953 to June 1955. Sparks was the holder of 145 patents. Sparks was posthumously inducted to the American Inventor Hall of Fame in the Spring of 2016.

Sparks was a firm believer in the benefits that innovation could provide to society. However, he was concerned that the education of the upcoming scientific generation did not include the awakening of the social consciousness. He stated that "the scientific profession has become much larger than medicine, law or the clergy. Yet, many young scientists are not taught by their professors to feel an obligation to society in their work." Sparks believed that good science should benefit the world in which we live, contending that "Science without purpose is an art without responsibility."

== Honors and awards ==
- 1954 Awarded American Institute of Chemists Gold Medal
- 1963 Awarded Charles Goodyear Medal for the functionality of elastomers.
- 1964 Awarded the Perkin Medal
- 1965 Awarded the Priestley Medal
- 1965 Awarded the Golden Plate Award of the American Academy of Achievement
- 1967 Elected to National Academy of Engineering
- 1970 Awarded Chemical Pioneer Award
- The ACS Rubber Division's Sparks-Thomas award is named after Sparks and Butyl rubber co-inventor Robert M. Thomas.
- 2016 National Inventors Hall of Fame Inductee
