= Adel F. Halasa =

American scientist (1933–2026)

Adel Farhan Halasa (December 24, 1933-March 26, 2026) was an American scientist (originally Jordanian) noted for his contributions to the development of rubber, particularly in the area of tire tread polymers for the Goodyear AquaTred tire. In 1997, he won the Charles Goodyear Medal, bestowed by the American Chemical Society, Rubber Division to individuals who "have been the principal inventor(s), innovator(s), or developer(s) of a significant change or contribution to the rubber industry".

== Education ==
Halasa attended the Bishop's School in Amman, Jordan. In 1955, Halasa received a Bachelor of Science Degree in Chemistry from the University of Oklahoma. He continued his studies and in 1959 completed his master's degree in organic chemistry at Butler University in Indianapolis, Indiana. Halasa completed his Ph.D. at Purdue University in West Lafayette, Indiana in 1964. He later completed additional studies in polymer chemistry at the University of Akron.

== Career ==
Halasa worked as a research associate, and group leader in materials development at Firestone Tire & Rubber Company, starting in 1963. In 1979, he accepted an assignment with the Kuwaiti Government to establish a polymer program at the Kuwait Institute for Scientific Research. From 1983 to 2009, Halasa served as R&D Fellow at Goodyear Tire & Rubber Company in Akron, OH. His most cited works treated the subject of polar-modified alkyllithium polymerizations and copolymerizations, and the subject of the effect of crosslinking on changes in free volume in elastomers.

== Honors and awards ==
- 1997 Charles Goodyear Medal of the ACS Rubber Division
- 2004 Purdue University College of Science Distinguished Alumni award.
