= George Oenslager =

Goodrich chemist

George Oenslager (September 25, 1873 – February 5, 1956) was a Goodrich chemist who discovered that a derivative of aniline accelerated the vulcanization of rubber with sulfur. He first introduced carbon black as a rubber reinforcing agent in 1912.

== Biography ==
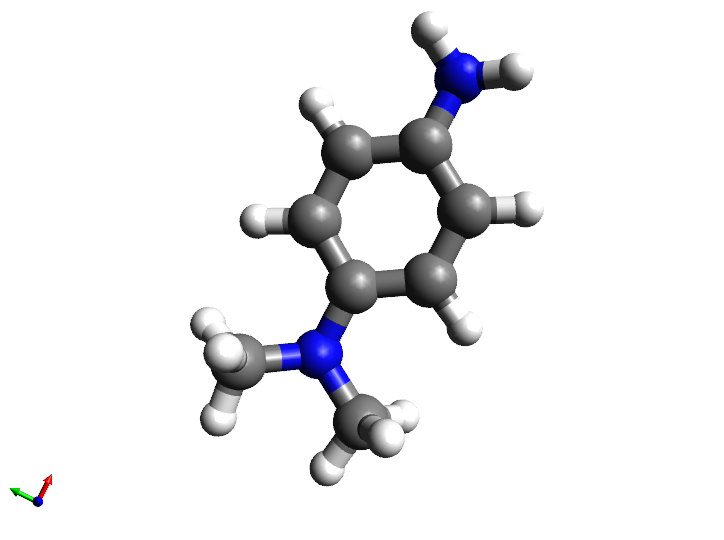
Diamond Rubber Co. researchers David Spence and George Oenslager developed para-aminodimethylaniline as a vulcanization accelerator in 1912.

Oenslager attended Harrisburg & Phillips Exeter Academies, AB 1894, AM 1896. He first worked for the Warren Paper Co. in Maine from 1896 until 1905. He then worked for the Diamond & B.F. Goodrich Rubber Companies from 1905 until 1940. In 1912, Oenslager was working with David Spence at Diamond Rubber on additives to improve the vulcanization process. Working off of Oenslager's aniline additives, Spence discovered that p-aminodimethylaniline was a far superior accelerator, vastly improving the tensile strength of the rubber. para-aminodimethylaniline was adopted as the accelerator of choice by the Diamond Rubber Company in 1912. During World War I Oenslager inflated the first hydrogen balloon in the US.

Oenslager received his Ph.D. from Harvard under Prof. Theodore William Richards.

He was awarded the Perkin Medal in 1933 for his discovery of organic accelerators, specifically thiocarbanilide. This development crucial to the commercialization of both natural and synthetic rubber. Oenslager was awarded the Charles Goodyear Medal in 1948.

He was married to Ruth Alderfer Oenslager.
