= Joseph Kennedy (professor) =

University of Akron Distinguished Professor of Polymer Science and Chemistry

- Born: Joszi Kaufmann; 18 May 1928; Kingdom of Hungary
- Died: 19 July 2024 (aged 96); United States
- Education: University of Vienna
- Occupations: Chemist, professor
- Known for: Advancements in stent technology
- Awards: Charles Goodyear Medal (2008)

Joseph Kennedy (born Joszi Kaufmann, 18 May 1928 – 19 July 2024) was a Hungarian-born professor of polymer science and chemistry who had a lengthy academic career at the University of Akron in the United States. He was perhaps best known for inventing a polymer coating for a drug-tipped stent that is highly compatible to human tissue, which was successfully commercialized by Boston Scientific and credited for saving the lives of six million patients. He also made important contributions to the field of carbocationic polymerization.

== Personal ==
Kennedy spent his youth in Budapest, Hungary, during World War II and the beginning of the Cold War. His father was killed by the Nazis, and his mother was imprisoned by communists. In 1948, he was kicked out of the college where he earned his first degree in chemistry, "for being too bourgeois".

At age 19, Kennedy fled to Austria as an illegal immigrant. He gained citizenship upon earning his doctorate in biochemistry from the University of Vienna, and he then completed postgraduate work at the Sorbonne in France.

In 1954, he immigrated to be close to family in Canada, and to take another postdoctoral position at McGill University in Montreal. There he met Ingrid, who later became his wife.

Following many years of success in his field, Kennedy accepted an Honorary Doctorate from Kossuth University in 1989. He was also elected a member of the Hungarian Academy of Sciences in 1993.

== Career ==
Kennedy's first employment in America was in 1957 with the chemical company Celanese in Summit, New Jersey. He later joined Exxon, where he apprenticed under Robert M. Thomas, and held a series of positions with increasing responsibility.

Kennedy's interest in pure science eventually led him to seek a position in academia. In 1970, he accepted a position with the University of Akron, where he helped to develop the College of Polymer Science and Polymer Engineering. He was a recipient of the Charles Goodyear Medal and served as the Distinguished Professor of Polymer Science and Chemistry at the University of Akron.

As of 2022, Kennedy had been awarded 146 United States patents. At that time, when asked who benefitted from his work, Kennedy stated:

Society. I used to be a refugee, so my allegiance is strongly American. I believe the United States is the ultimate destination for people seeking freedom and opportunity. I will never be able to fully repay this magnificent land of ours for the security and peace it gave me. Only in the U.S. could a refugee accomplish what I did after experiencing the terrible regimes of Nazis and Communists. I want to repay what was given to me and help people.

== Awards ==
- Döbereiner Medaille, F. Schiller Universität, Jena, DDR, 1985
- Honorary Doctorate (Doctor Honoris Causa, D.H.C.), Kossuth University, Debrecen, Hungary, 1989
- Elected External Member of the Hungarian Academy of Sciences, 1993
- George S. Whitby Award for Excellence in Teaching and Research, Rubber Division, Am. Chem. Soc., 1996
- Award for Distinguished Service to Polymer Science, Society of Polymer Science, Japan, 2000
- Charles Goodyear Medal, Rubber Division, American Chemical Society, 2008
- Honorary Doctorate (D.H.C.), The University of Akron, 2008
- Elected Fellow of American Institute of Medical and Biological Engineering (AIMBE), 2010
- Heart Champion Award, American Heart Association, 2011
- Ohio Patent Legacy Award, The Ohio Academy of Science, 2011
