= James E. Mark =

American academic

James E. Mark (December 14, 1934 - September 23, 2017) was a Distinguished Research Professor at the University of Cincinnati.

Mark made important contributions to understanding the physical chemistry of polymers. His contributions included models of the elasticity of polymer networks, hybrid organic-inorganic composites, liquid-crystalline polymers, and a variety of computer simulations.

== Personal ==
Mark was born on December 14, 1934, in Wilkes-Barre, Pennsylvania.

== Education ==
Mark received his B.S. degree in 1957 in Chemistry from Wilkes College and his Ph.D. degree in 1962 in physical chemistry from the University of Pennsylvania. After completing his doctoral work, he served as a Postdoctoral Fellow at Stanford University under Paul J. Flory.

== Career ==
Mark entered academia as an assistant professor of chemistry at the Polytechnic Institute of Brooklyn. He later moved to the University of Michigan, where he became a Full Professor in 1972. In 1977, he assumed the position of Professor of Chemistry at the University of Cincinnati, and served as Chairman of the Physical Chemistry Division and Director of the Polymer Research Center. In 1987, he was named the first Distinguished Research Professor.

He is the founding editor of the journal Computational and Theoretical Polymer Science, which was started in 1990, is an editor for the journal Polymer.

== Awards ==
Mark has received many awards including the Whitby Award and the 1999 Charles Goodyear Medal (Rubber Division of the American Chemical Society), the ACS Applied Polymer Science Award, the Flory Polymer Education Award (ACS Division of Polymer Chemistry), the ACS Kipping Award in Silicon Chemistry.

== Bibliography ==
- Mark, James E (2013). Science and Technology of Rubber, Edition 4. Academic Press. ISBN 978-0123945846.
