= Charles Greville Williams =

English scientist and analytical chemist

Charles H. Greville Williams (22 September 1829 – 15 June 1910), was an English scientist and analytical chemist who published many scientific papers from 1853. He was born in Cheltenham, Gloucestershire. He died in Horley and is buried in Streatham.

== Professional life ==
He was elected as a Fellow of The Royal Society in 1862.

Throughout the later 19th century, many chemists attempted to determine the makeup of natural rubber, with the goal of reproducing it. In 1860, Williams analyzed rubber by destructive distillation and obtained a large quantity of a light oil which he termed isoprene (polymer of the monomer isoprene—formula CH_{2}:C(CH_{3})CH:CH_{2}). Many efforts were made during the next 70 years to synthesize rubber in the laboratory by using isoprene as the monomer, but these did not bear fruit until Samuel Horne succeeded in 1955.

In 1868, he established the Brentford dyestuff works Williams, Thomas and Dower in New York City. The firm was liquidated in 1878 and in 1879 his two elder sons Rupert and Lewis established a dyestuffs factory at Hounslow with the help of former employees.
