= Thiokol (polymer) =

Organic polysulfide polymers

Thiokol is a trade mark for various organic polysulfide polymers. Thiokol polymers are used as an elastomer in seals and sealants. The distinction between the polymers first commercialized by the Thiokol Chemical Company and subsequent polysulfide materials is often unclear.

The name Thiokol is a portmanteau of the Greek words for sulfur (Greek: θεῖον, romanized: theion) and glue (Greek: κόλλα, romanized: kolla)

== Preparation and structure ==
A variety of thiokols are recognized. Typically they are prepared by the combination of 2-chloroethanol, formaldehyde, and sodium polysulfide (Na_{2}S_{x}). The chloroethanol is produced in situ from ethylene oxide and hydrogen chloride. The rank x of the polysulfide is an important variable. Crosslinking agents are used, such as 1,2,3-trichloropropane. An idealized polymer is represented by this formula HS(CH_{2}CH_{2}OCH_{2}OCH_{2}CH_{2}SS)_{n}CH_{2}CH_{2}OCH_{2}OCH_{2}CH_{2}SH. Thiol-terminated resins can be cured oxidatively.

== History ==
In 1838, Swiss chemists reported the preparation of hydrophobic rubbery materials by the alkylation of sodium polysulfide with 1,2-dichloroethane. In 1926 chemists Joseph C. Patrick and Nathan Mnookin further developed this class of materials, which first achieved commercial success as sealants for fuel lines, exploiting the solvent resistance of these materials. The company Thiokol was founded in 1929 to produce these polymers. In the 1940s, thiol-terminated liquid resins were produced. Curing could be effected oxidatively, e.g. using lead oxides and later perborates. Thiokol polymers were used as a binder in solid rocket fuel, a commercial success.
