= Strain crystallization =

Process occurring in some polymers

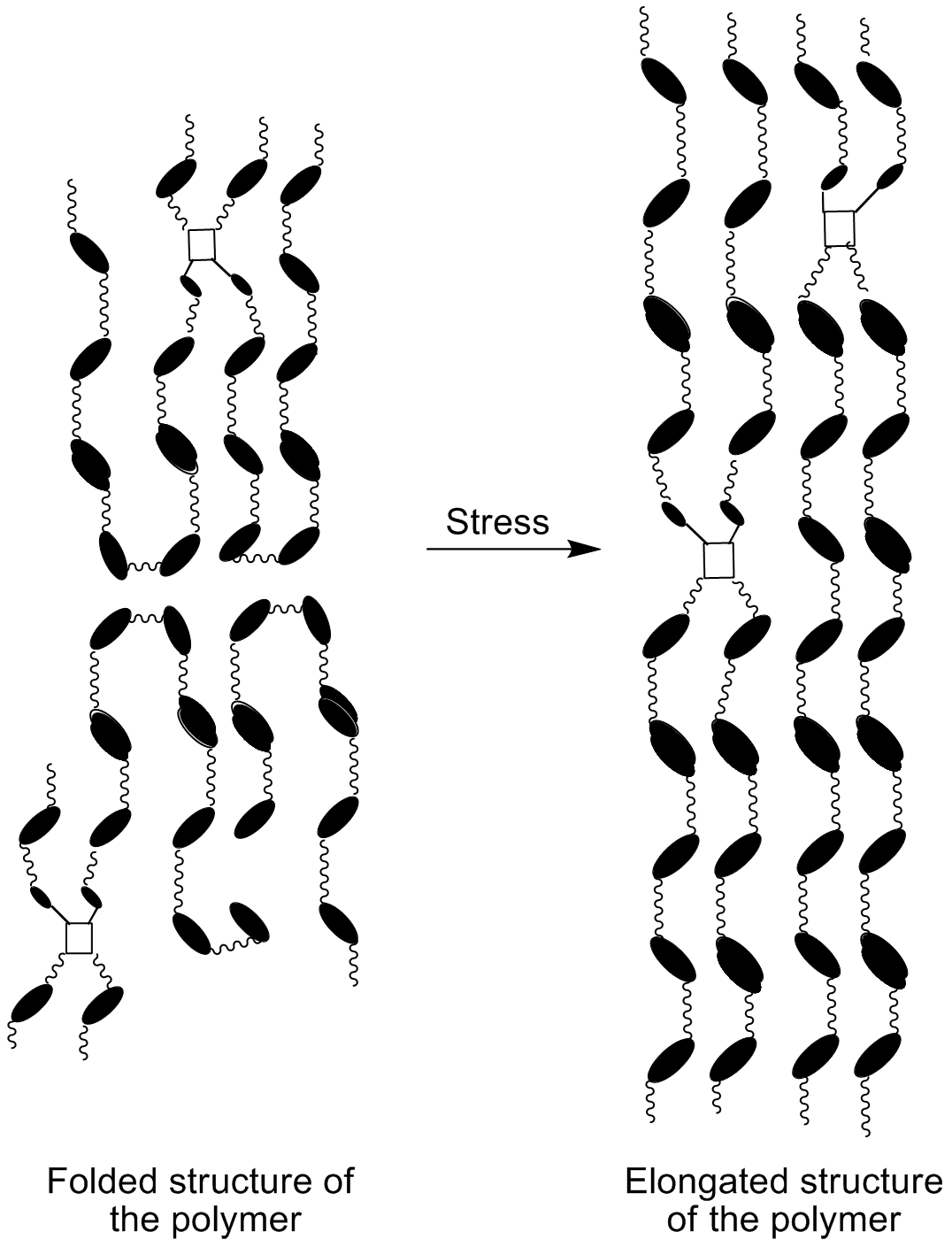
Structure of polymer experiencing strain crystallization

Strain crystallization is a phenomenon in which an initially amorphous solid material undergoes a phase transformation due to the application of strain. Strain crystallization occurs in natural rubber, as well as other elastomers and polymers. The phenomenon has important effects on strength and fatigue properties.

== How strain crystallization occurs ==
Strain crystallization occurs when the chains of molecules in a material become ordered during deformation activities in some polymers and elastomers. The three primary factors that affect strain crystallization are the molecular structure of the polymer or elastomer, the temperature, and the deformation being applied to the material. If a polymer's molecular structure is too irregular, strain crystallization can not be induced because it is impossible to order the chains of molecules. In order to induce strain crystallization, the polymer or elastomer is stretched while its temperature is kept above its glass transition temperature. It is also necessary for the yield point of the polymer to be exceeded by the stretching activity. This in turn will ensure that the chains of molecules are straightened. In general, the greater the deformation applied to the material, the higher the rate of crystallization.

== Effects of strain crystallization ==
The mechanical properties of materials are greatly affected by the orientation of the crystals in their micro-structure. The process of strain crystallization directly affects the micro-structure of the material by adding crystalline structures. Strain crystallization's effect on the micro-structure greatly increases the strength of the polymer or elastomer it is induced in. This effect of strain crystallization can be viewed in vulcanized natural rubber, a material that is known for its toughness and tensile stress.

== Measuring strain crystallization ==
There are various techniques for measuring crystallization in rubber, including: x-ray diffraction, specific heat changes, and density changes. Crystallization can also be observed indirectly through its effects on stress–strain and fatigue behavior.

== See also ==
- Crystallization of polymers

Some polymers that strain crystallize

- Polyethylene
- Polyethylene Terephthalate

Some elastomers that strain crystallize

- Natural rubber (polyisoprene)
- Polychloroprene

Some elastomers that do not strain crystallize

- Polybutadiene
- Styrene-butadiene
