= Shades of black =

Varieties of the color black

Black
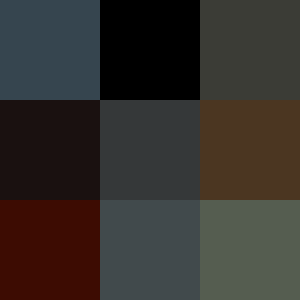

Common connotations
- Darkness, evil, luxury, mourning, death, depression, depth, solidity

Color coordinates
- Hex triplet: #000000
- sRGB^{B} (r, g, b): (0, 0, 0)
- HSV (h, s, v): (0°, 0%, 0%)
- CIELCh_{uv} (L, C, h): (0, 0, 0°)
- Source: X11/By definition
- B: Normalized to [0–255] (byte)

Shades of black, or off-black colors, are colors that differ only slightly from pure black. These colors have a low lightness. From a photometric point of view, a color which differs slightly from black always has low relative luminance. Colors often considered "shades of black" include onyx, black olive, charcoal, and jet.

These colors may be considered for part of a neutral color scheme, usually in interior design as a part of a background for brighter colors. Black and dark gray colors are powerful accent colors that suggest weight, dignity, formality, and solemnity.

In color theory, a shade is a pure color mixed with black. It decreases its lightness while nearly conserving its chromaticity. Strictly speaking, a "shade of black" is always a pure black itself, and a "tint of black" would be a neutral gray. In practice, many off-black colors possess a hue and a colorfulness (also called saturation).

== Black ==
Black is a color, the perception of which is evoked by the total absence of light that stimulates any of the three types of color sensitive cone cells in the human eye and with very low brightness compared to the surroundings. A black visual stimulation will be void of hue and grayness. Black is the darkest possible color.

=== Technical black varieties ===
Surface treatments to reflect as little light as possible have been developed throughout history, usually based on carbon. Intensive research to approach the ideal black body (which would absorb all incident electromagnetic radiation) though has emerged mainly in the 21st century. Important technical blacks include carbon black, super black and Vantablack.

In printing, rich black uses 100% black ink with the addition of other inks to achieve a blacker color.

== Variations of black (off-black colors) ==
The colors are arranged in order of value or brightness, with the lightest colors at the top and the darkest at the bottom.

=== Dim gray ===
Dim gray

Color coordinates
- Hex triplet: #696969
- sRGB^{B} (r, g, b): (105, 105, 105)
- HSV (h, s, v): (0°, 0%, 41%)
- CIELCh_{uv} (L, C, h): (44, 0, 0°)
- Source: X11
- ISCC–NBS descriptor: Dark gray
- B: Normalized to [0–255] (byte)

Dim gray
#696969

The web color dim gray is a dark tone of gray.

The color name dim gray first came into use in 1987, when this color was formulated as one of the colors on the X11 color list, introduced that year. After the invention of the World Wide Web in 1991, these colors became known as the "X11 web colors".

=== Cool black ===
Cool black (PMS 295)

Color coordinates
- Hex triplet: #002E63
- sRGB^{B} (r, g, b): (0, 46, 99)
- HSV (h, s, v): (212°, 100%, 39%)
- CIELCh_{uv} (L, C, h): (19, 41, 255°)
- ISCC–NBS descriptor: Very dark blue
- B: Normalized to [0–255] (byte)

Cool black
#002E63

Cool black is a dark shade of blue. It is one of the Pantone colors.

=== Ebony ===
Ebony

Color coordinates
- Hex triplet: #555D50
- sRGB^{B} (r, g, b): (85, 93, 80)
- HSV (h, s, v): (97°, 14%, 36%)
- CIELCh_{uv} (L, C, h): (38, 10, 113°)
- Source: Maerz and Paul
- ISCC–NBS descriptor: Grayish olive green
- B: Normalized to [0–255] (byte)

Ebony
#555D50

The color ebony is a representation of the color of the wood ebony, a tropical hardwood widely used to make fine furniture, notably for French kings.

The first use of ebony as a color name in English was in 1590.

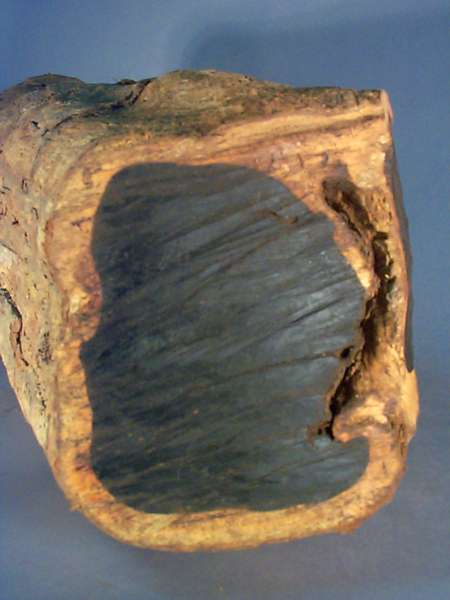
Ebony wood

=== Davy's grey ===
Davy's gray

Color coordinates
- Hex triplet: #555555
- sRGB^{B} (r, g, b): (85, 85, 85)
- HSV (h, s, v): (0°, 0%, 33%)
- CIELCh_{uv} (L, C, h): (36, 0, 0°)
- Source: ISCC-NBS
- ISCC–NBS descriptor: Dark gray
- B: Normalized to [0–255] (byte)

Davy's Gray
#555555

Davy's gray is a dark gray color, made from powdered slate, iron oxide and carbon black named for Henry Davy.

The first recorded use of Davy's gray as a color name in English was in the 19th century (precise date uncertain).

=== Charcoal ===
Charcoal

Color coordinates
- Hex triplet: #36454F
- sRGB^{B} (r, g, b): (54, 69, 79)
- HSV (h, s, v): (204°, 32%, 31%)
- CIELCh_{uv} (L, C, h): (28, 12, 231°)
- Source: ISCC-NBS
- ISCC–NBS descriptor: Dark grayish blue
- B: Normalized to [0–255] (byte)

Charcoal
#36454F

Charcoal is a color that is a representation of the dark gray color of burned wood.

The first recorded use of charcoal as a color name in English was in 1606.

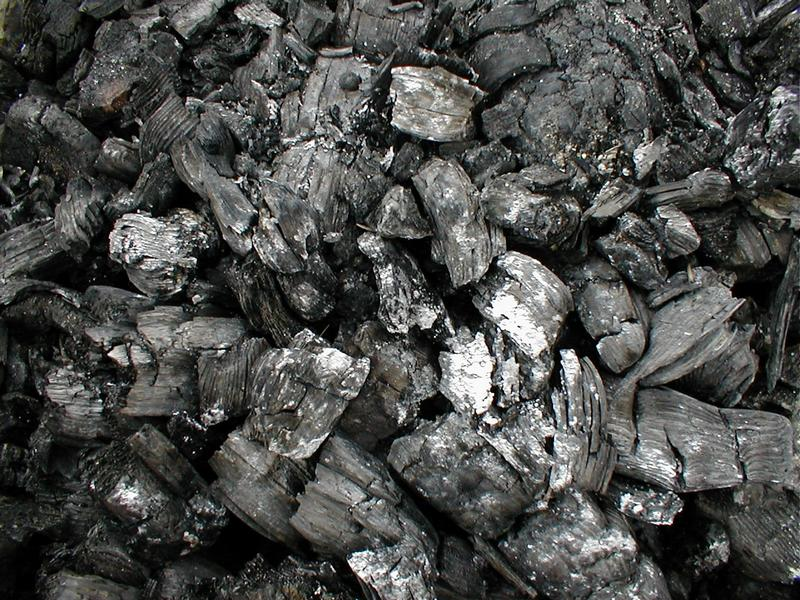
Charcoal

=== Outer Space ===
Outer Space

Color coordinates
- Hex triplet: #2D383A
- sRGB^{B} (r, g, b): (45, 56, 58)
- HSV (h, s, v): (189°, 22%, 23%)
- CIELCh_{uv} (L, C, h): (23, 6, 206°)
- Source: Crayola
- ISCC–NBS descriptor: Dark grayish green
- B: Normalized to [0–255] (byte)

Outer Space
#2D383A

The color Outer Space was formulated by Crayola in 1998. The color was named after the sky in outer space.

=== Taupe ===
Taupe

Color coordinates
- Hex triplet: #483C32
- sRGB^{B} (r, g, b): (72, 60, 50)
- HSV (h, s, v): (27°, 31%, 28%)
- CIELCh_{uv} (L, C, h): (26, 11, 47°)
- Source: ISCC-NBS
- ISCC–NBS descriptor: Dark grayish yellowish brown
- B: Normalized to [0–255] (byte)

Taupe
#483C32

The color displayed at right matches the color sample called taupe referenced below in the 1930 book A Dictionary of Color, the world standard for color terms before the invention of computers. However, the word taupe is currently often used to refer to lighter shades of taupe, and therefore another name for this color is dark taupe.

The first use of taupe as a color name in English was in the early 19th century (exact year is not known).

=== Bean ===
Bean

Color coordinates
- Hex triplet: #3D0C02
- sRGB^{B} (r, g, b): (61, 12, 2)
- HSV (h, s, v): (10°, 97%, 24%)
- CIELCh_{uv} (L, C, h): (11, 28, 17°)
- Source: Xona.com
- B: Normalized to [0–255] (byte)

Bean
#3D0C02

Bean is a color that resembles black beans. It is on the Xona.com Color List, which was formulated in 2001.

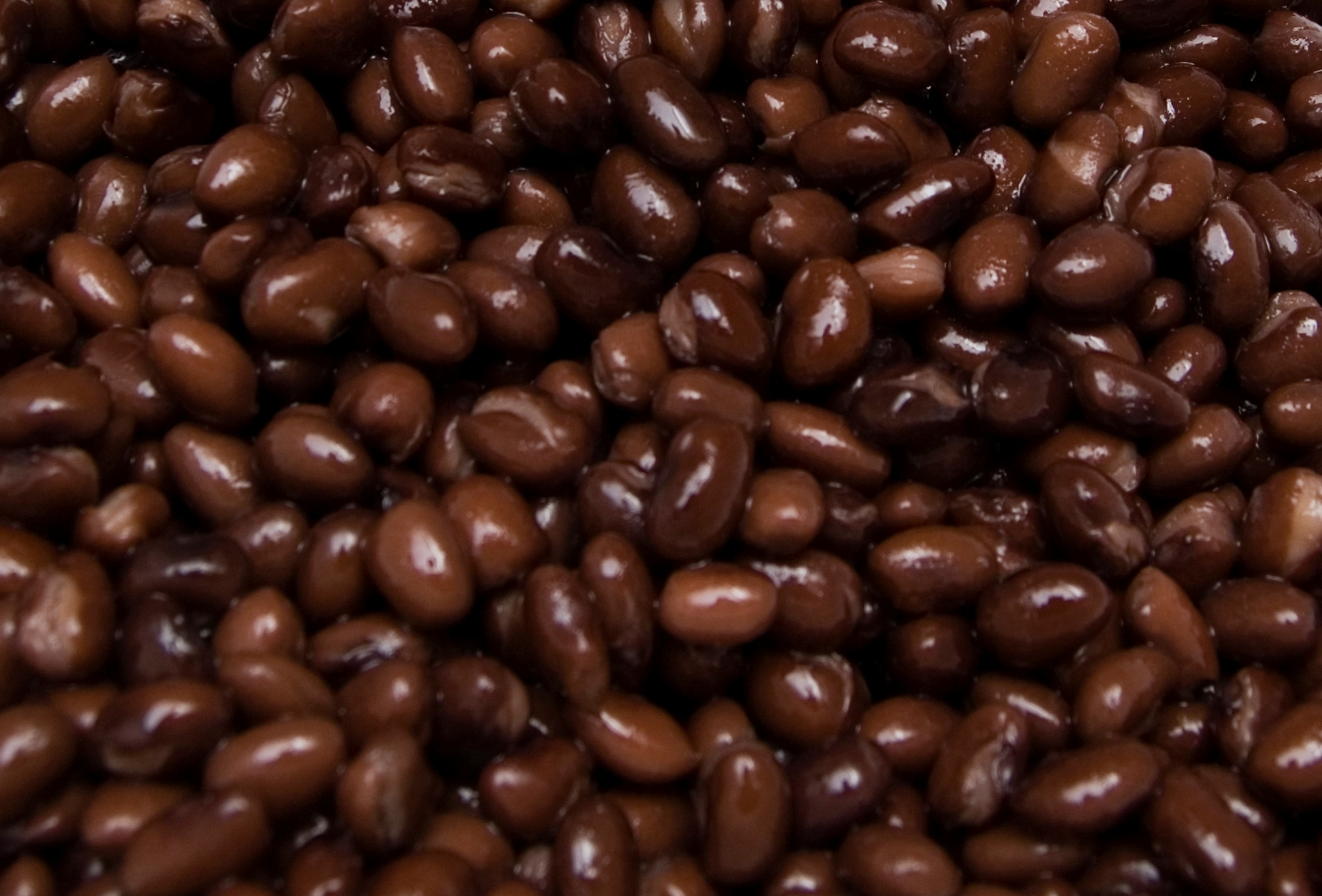
Black beans

=== Black olive ===
Black Olive (RAL)

Color coordinates
- Hex triplet: #3B3C36
- sRGB^{B} (r, g, b): (59, 60, 54)
- HSV (h, s, v): (70°, 10%, 24%)
- CIELCh_{uv} (L, C, h): (25, 4, 93°)
- Source: RAL
- ISCC–NBS descriptor: Dark grayish olive green
- B: Normalized to [0–255] (byte)

Black Olive
#3B3C36

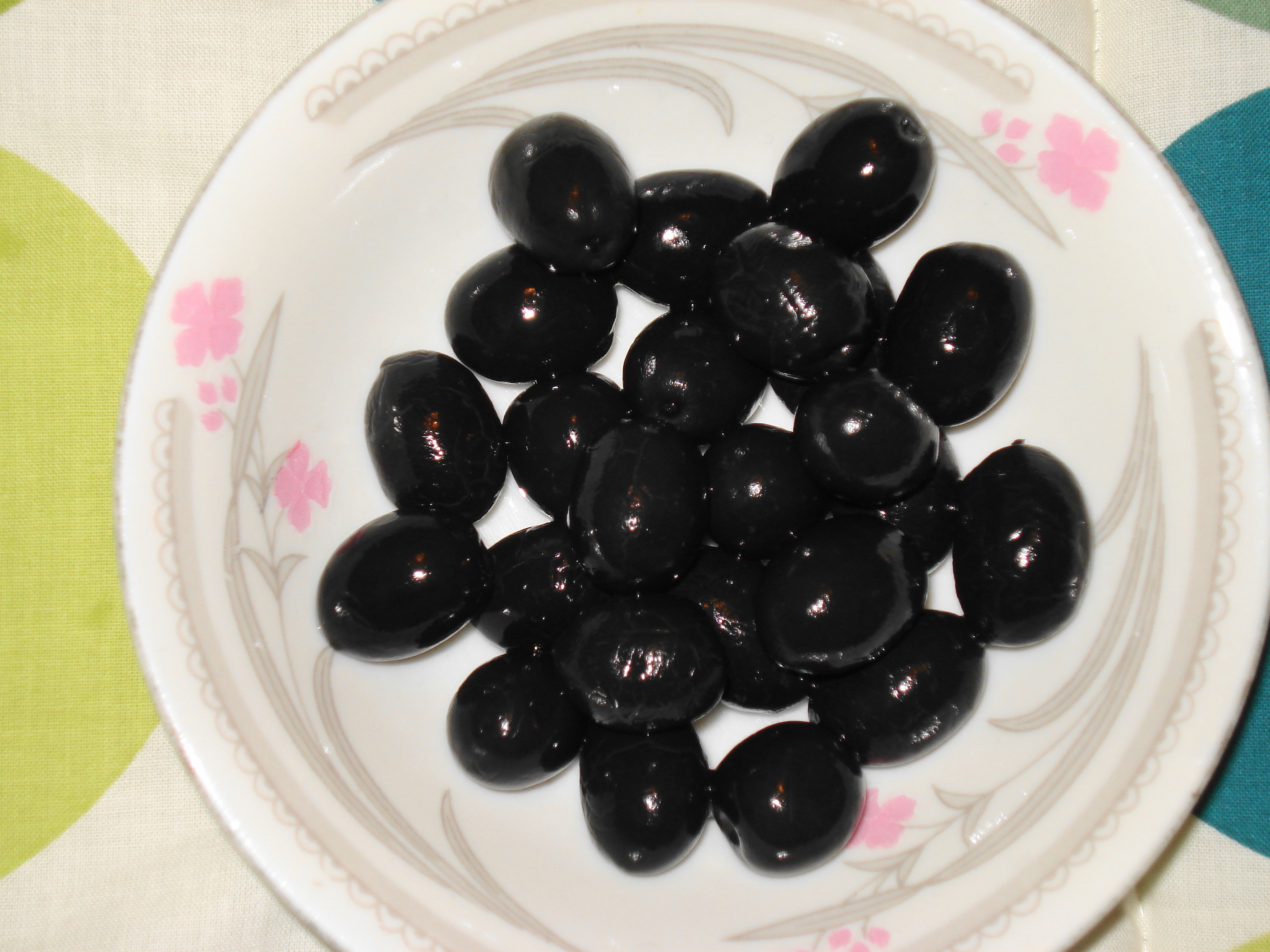
Black olives on a plate

Black olive is a representation of the color of black olives. Also known as black olive, color No. 6015, in the RAL color matching system, widely used in Europe.

=== Onyx ===
Onyx

Color coordinates
- Hex triplet: #0F0F0F
- sRGB^{B} (r, g, b): (15, 15, 15)
- HSV (h, s, v): (0°, 0%, 6%)
- CIELCh_{uv} (L, C, h): (4, 0, 0°)
- Source: Crayola
- ISCC–NBS descriptor: Black
- B: Normalized to [0–255] (byte)

Onyx
#0F0F0F

The color onyx is a representation of the color of onyx.

This is one of the colors in the Crayola specialty crayon set called "Gem Tones", introduced in 1994.

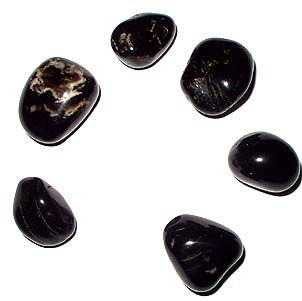
Black onyx with bands of colors

=== Jet ===
Jet

Color coordinates
- Hex triplet: #343434
- sRGB^{B} (r, g, b): (52, 52, 52)
- HSV (h, s, v): (0°, 0%, 20%)
- CIELCh_{uv} (L, C, h): (22, 0, 0°)
- Source: ISCC-NBS
- ISCC–NBS descriptor: Black
- B: Normalized to [0–255] (byte)

Jet black (RAL 9005)

Color coordinates
- Hex triplet: #131516
- sRGB^{B} (r, g, b): (19, 21, 22)
- HSV (h, s, v): (200°, 14%, 9%)
- CIELCh_{uv} (L, C, h): (7, 1, 222°)
- Source: RAL Classic
- ISCC–NBS descriptor: Black
- B: Normalized to [0–255] (byte)

Jet
#343434

Jet black (RAL 9005)
#131516

The color jet, also called jet black, is a representation of the color of the mineraloid jet.

The first recorded use of jet as a color name in English was in 1450.

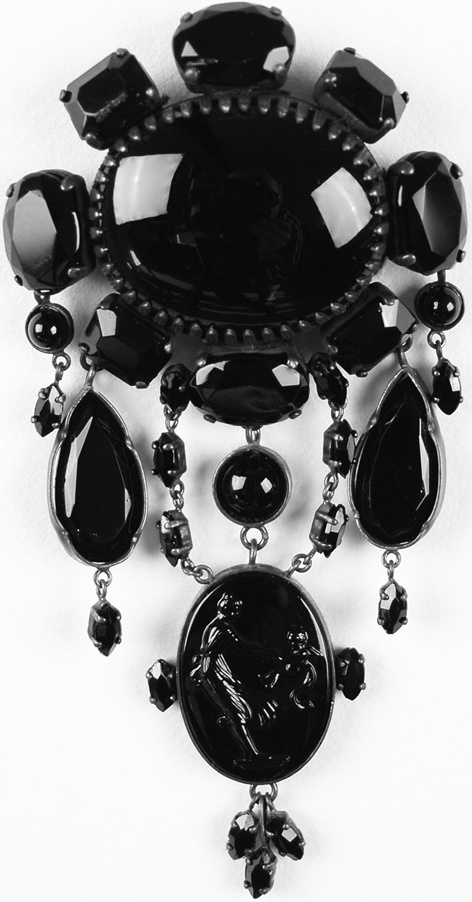
Mourning jewelry: jet brooch, 19th century

An iPhone 7 in Jet Black

=== Raisin black ===
Raisin Black

Color coordinates
- Hex triplet: #242124
- sRGB^{B} (r, g, b): (36, 33, 36)
- HSV (h, s, v): (300°, 8%, 14%)
- CIELCh_{uv} (L, C, h): (13, 2, 308°)
- Source: ISCC-NBS
- ISCC–NBS descriptor: Black
- B: Normalized to [0–255] (byte)

Raisin Black
#242124

Raisin black is a color that is a representation of the color of black raisins.

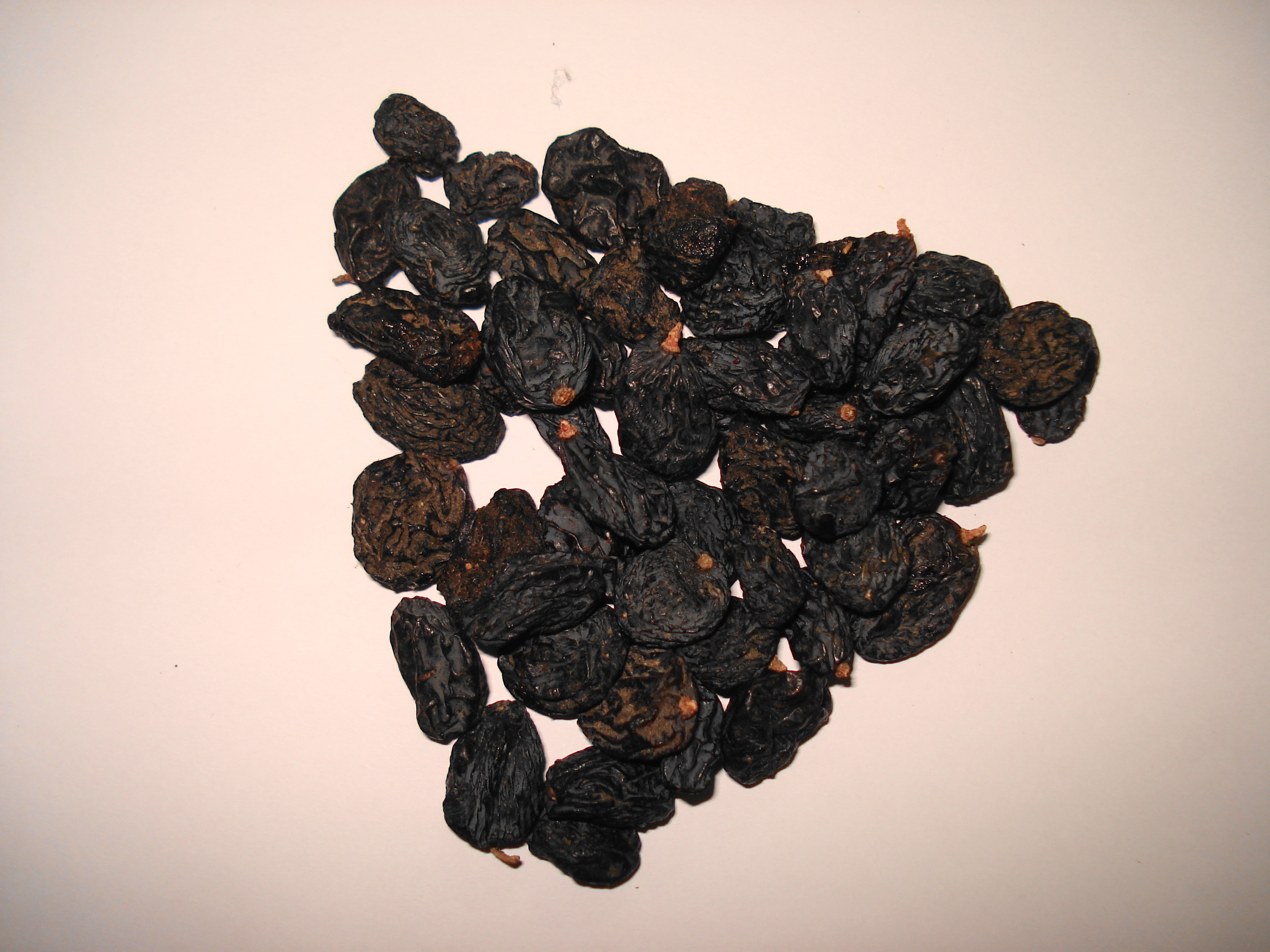
Black raisins

=== Charleston green ===
Charleston green

Color coordinates
- Hex triplet: #232B2B
- sRGB^{B} (r, g, b): (35, 43, 43)
- HSV (h, s, v): (180°, 19%, 17%)
- CIELCh_{uv} (L, C, h): (17, 3, 192°)
- ISCC–NBS descriptor: Blackish green
- B: Normalized to [0–255] (byte)

Charleston Green
#232B2B

According to a popular story, the color Charleston green originated after the American Civil War, when the North provided black paint to the South for use in its reconstruction. The inhabitants of Charleston, South Carolina mixed the black with a little bit of yellow and blue and created Charleston green. The earliest known use of the term to describe a dark shade of greenish black is 1953.

Since this color has a hue code of 180, it is actually an extremely dark shade of cyan. The paint manufacturer Duron/Sherwin-Williams paint color number for "historic Charleston green" is DCR099—the color sample at right was taken from this color swatch (hex code #232B2B), which is on the website accessible called Colors of Historic Charleston. This color looks black unless the sun hits it just right, and then the color registers a very dark forest green. From Rust-Oleum paint company it is color No. 214086 but still looks black on color cards.

=== Vampire black ===
Vampire black

Color coordinates
- Hex triplet: #080808
- sRGB^{B} (r, g, b): (8, 8, 8)
- HSV (h, s, v): (0°, 0%, 3%)
- CIELCh_{uv} (L, C, h): (2, 0, 0°)
- Source: Encycolorpedia
- ISCC–NBS descriptor: Black
- B: Normalized to [0–255] (byte)

Vampire black
#080808

The color vampire black is a very dark shade of gray.

=== Eerie black ===
Eerie black

Color coordinates
- Hex triplet: #1B1B1B
- sRGB^{B} (r, g, b): (27, 27, 27)
- HSV (h, s, v): (0°, 0%, 11%)
- CIELCh_{uv} (L, C, h): (10, 0, 0°)
- Source: Crayola
- ISCC–NBS descriptor: Black
- B: Normalized to [0–255] (byte)

Eerie Black
#1B1B1B

The color eerie black was formulated by Crayola in the early 2000s as one of the colors in its Heads 'n Tails specialty box of colors.

=== Licorice ===
Licorice

Color coordinates
- Hex triplet: #1A1110
- sRGB^{B} (r, g, b): (26, 17, 16)
- HSV (h, s, v): (6°, 38%, 10%)
- CIELCh_{uv} (L, C, h): (6, 3, 19°)
- Source: Crayola
- ISCC–NBS descriptor: Black
- B: Normalized to [0–255] (byte)

Licorice
#1A1110

The color licorice (also known as light black) was introduced by Crayola in 1994 as one of the colors in its specialty Crayola Magic Scent crayons with the scent of licorice candy.

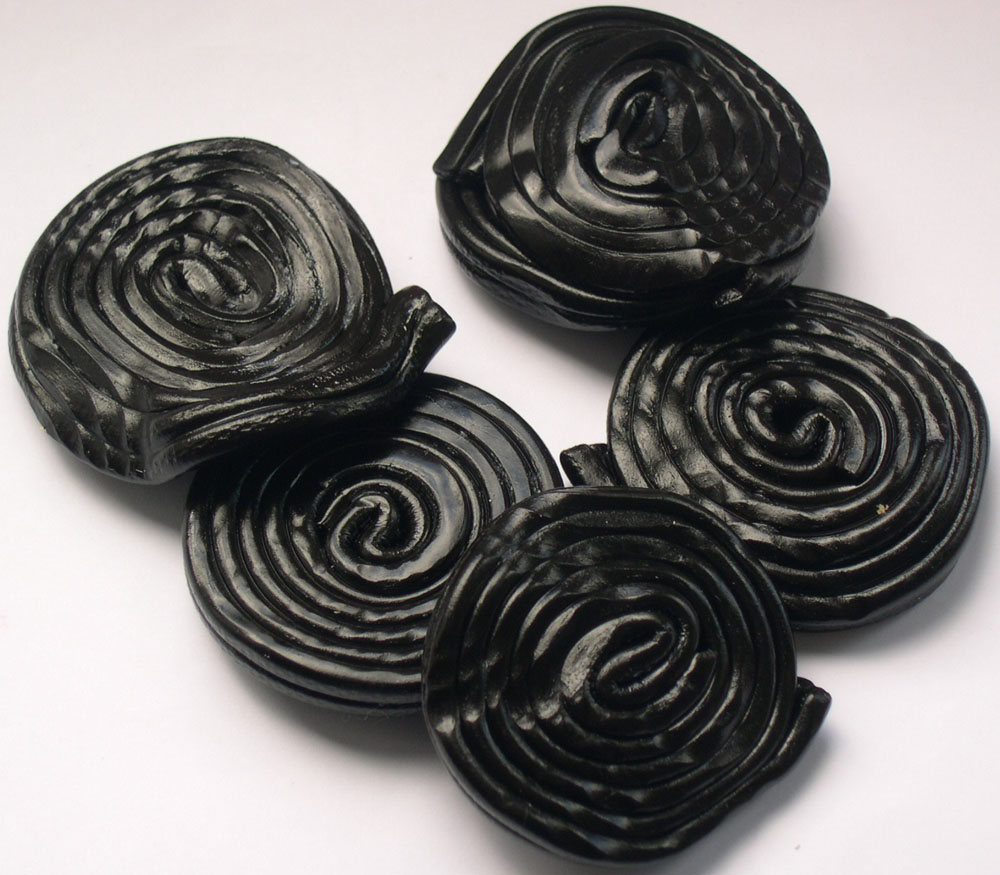
Licorice wheels

== See also ==
- Ultra-Black
- Lists of colors
- Shades of white
- Shades of red
