= Vantablack (disambiguation) =

Vantablack is an extremely black chemical substance.

Vantablack may also refer to:

- Vantablack (EP), a 2017 dubstep extended play by Dirtyphonics and Sullivan King
- "Vantablack", a 2017 song by French synthwave musician Perturbator
- "Vantablack", a 2022 episode of Fleishman Is in Trouble (miniseries)
- "Vantablack", the hero codename of Shihai Kuroiro, a character from the manga My Hero Academia
- Vantablack, a 2024 album by Lalah Hathaway
- Vantablack, a 2024 song by Benxify

== See also ==
- Vanta (disambiguation)
