= Vanta =

Vanta may refer to:

- Vanta, an American software company
- Vantaa, a city in Finland
- Nvidia Vanta, a graphics accelerator manufactured by Nvidia
- Vertically aligned carbon nanotube arrays, an advanced material surface
  - Vantablack, a super-black surface coating based on nanotubes
- "Vanta", a song by the British progressive metal band Monuments.
