= Vantas =

Vantas may refer to:

- Karkat and Kankri Vantas, characters from the webcomic Homestuck (2009-2016)
- Vertically aligned carbon nanotube arrays (VANTAs)
- Histrelin acetate, a drug sold under the brand name Vantas
- Vantas, a cancelled brand of Exeed TX SUVs in North America
