= Ultra-Black =

Very dark shade of black

Ultra-black is one of the darkest shades of the color black. An ultra-black substance is defined as reflecting less than 0.5% of the light that hits its surface. This color is a biological pigment and part of the natural coloration of some species of birds-of-paradise, butterflies, and fishes, and ultra-black components are used in telescopes, cameras, and solar panels to improve the efficiency of light capture.

== Discovery in fish ==
The first recorded instance of ultra-black coloration being discovered in a species of fish occurred in 2020, when a group of researchers were examining fishes caught in trawls during research cruises in Monterey Bay, California, and the Gulf of Mexico. A total of 16 out of the 18 species caught in these trawls were found to have skin that reflected less than 0.5% of the light that hit it and that could thus be termed ultra-black. The specimen with the darkest skin, an anglerfish belonging to the genus Oneirodes, also tied some species of birds-of-paradise as having the darkest pigment in any animal, reflecting only 0.044% of the light that hit it. This ultra-black skin may serve several purposes depending on the biology, preferred food sources, and predators of each species. While most of these species likely use this coloration as camouflage to hide from predators, some of them, including fish that attract prey using bioluminescent lures like Astronesthes micropogon and Oneirodes sp., could potentially use ultra-black skin to catch prey unawares and prevent them from being seen in the light from their own lures. In some cases, ultra-black skin might also serve to block light that the fish does not want to emit, with ultra-black skin over the gut potentially blocking light emitted by bioluminescent prey while being digested.

=== Mechanism ===
The ultra-black coloration of these deep-sea fishes is due to a pigment called melanin, the same pigment that gives human skin its coloration, and the reason the skin of these fishes is so much darker than human skin is due to both the amount of melanin present and arrangement of the melanin. The skin of the deep-sea fishes contains one layer filled with small organelles called melanosomes that contain melanin, and in these fishes the melanosomes are both larger and more abundant than in other animals, with very few gaps resulting in a solid layer of pigment. The high concentration of the pigment is augmented by the melanosomes being aligned in a way that scatters incoming light sideways into other melanosomes rather than reflecting it directly back, which in turn increases the amount of pigment the light hits before it is reflected out of the fishes’ skin, ultimately reducing the amount of light that the fishes emit. This has a significant effect on reducing the fishes' visibility, and it is estimated that reducing the amount of light that a deep-sea fish reflects from 2% to 0.05% reduces the distance at which the fish can be seen by 84%. What makes these fishes unique from other animals that have ultra-black coloration, like butterflies and birds-of-paradise, is that those animals have structures that capture light and direct it into the melanin in their skin, while the fishes do not have those structures and rely solely on the pigment in their melanosomes to absorb incoming light. Being able to reproduce the mechanism these fishes use to absorb light has industrial applications because the ultra-black products humans make use carbon nanotubes, which are very delicate, to trap light and being able to replace these nanotubes with a pigment-based system would improve the durability of current products and open the door for new applications.

== See also ==
- Vantablack
