= Electroconductive carbon black =

Made up of primary carbon, carbon black is spherical in shape and arranged into aggregates and agglomerates. It differs from other carbon forms (diamond, graphite, coke) in its complex configuration, colloid dimensions and quasi-graphitic structure. Carbon black's purity and composition are practically free of inorganic pollutants and extractable organic substances.

A distinction is made between these two terms:

- Carbon black – a specially produced type of carbon using the process of incomplete combustion with restricted oxygen access. The article addresses this type of carbon.
- Soot – auxiliary fuel (coal, hydrocarbons, crude oil) combustion product, which is considered to be a hazardous substance with carcinogenic properties.

Carbon black can be characterized as a substance with over 97% amorphous carbon content. It is used extensively in many areas of industrial chemistry. It is often used in the plastic and rubber manufacturing industries, where it improves electrical conductivity and electromagnetic or thermo-conductive characteristics of plastic materials and rubbers. By virtue of its pigmentation capabilities, it is also used for the production of special printing inks, paints and varnishes. Thanks to its advanced porous structure, it is also used as a catalyst carrier, and its notable sorption attributes are used for, in example, catching gaseous pollutants at waste incinerator plants.

Carbon black predominantly includes a conductive type of carbon, which combines an extremely high specific surface and extensively developed structure – microporosity. At the same time, it consists of primary carbon particles and boasts a high degree of aggregation. Carbon black's grouping facilitates the formation of a conductive structure in plastics, rubbers and other composites. These characteristics predetermine electroconductive carbon black's primary area of application, i.e. electrical conductivity modification of nearly all types of plastic materials by adding a relatively low volume of carbon black. Such modifications can be used for numerous purposes, from establishing antistatic properties to adjusting polymer conductivity. Another valuable property of electroconductive carbon black is its excellent ability to absorb UV radiation on the visible spectrum, i.e. as a UV stabilizer for plastic materials, pigment in printer inks, paints and varnishes, or for coloring plastics, rubbers and sealants.

== Production ==
Carbon black begins as a byproduct of what is referred to as partial oxidation, a process during which crude oil residues, such as vacuum residues from crude oil distillation or residues from the thermic cracking process, split due to the effects of the mixture of oxygen and water steam under high temperatures around 1,300 °C.

Partial oxidation of various raw materials always creates a gaseous mixture containing CO, CO_{2}, H_{2}O, H_{2}, CH_{4} and H_{2}S and COS formed from sulfurous compounds. Carbon black is formed as an undesired byproduct. The amount of carbon black grows as the injection's molecular weight increases. Methane gasification produces approx. 0.02% mass, crude oil residue gasification approx. 1-3% mass.

During the respective process, carbon black is captured into water through the method of scrubbing, thus creating carbon black water. The generated carbon black water with 7–15 g/L of carbon black is further processed at the production facility into several types of carbonaceous substrates. The main production principle lies in isolating carbon from the water using granulation petrol, where intensive homogenization causes the carbon to transform from its aqueous to an organic phase, i.e. transformation of the water-carbon suspension to petrol-carbon suspension in the form of carbonaceous granules. The carbonaceous granules are subsequently processed into a finished product – carbonaceous substrate. The two mediums' proportionality primarily depends on carbon content and physical and chemical properties of the carbon black water and granulation petrol.

== Types of electroconductive carbon black ==
Carbon black	BET	OAN
conductive (cca)	120	100
superconductive (cca)	250	180
extraconductive (cca)	800–1200	300–400
ultraconductive	1300–1400	> 600

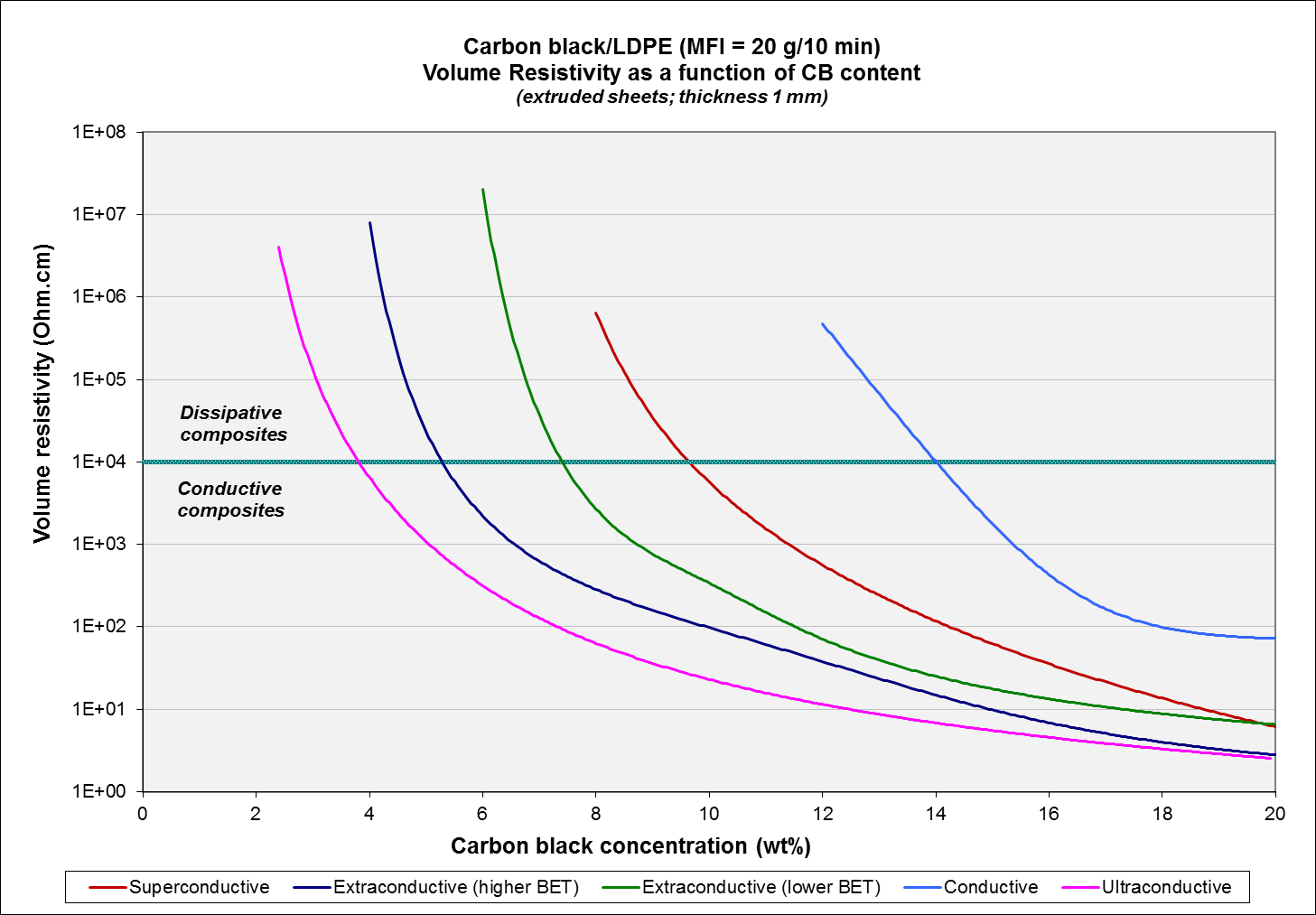

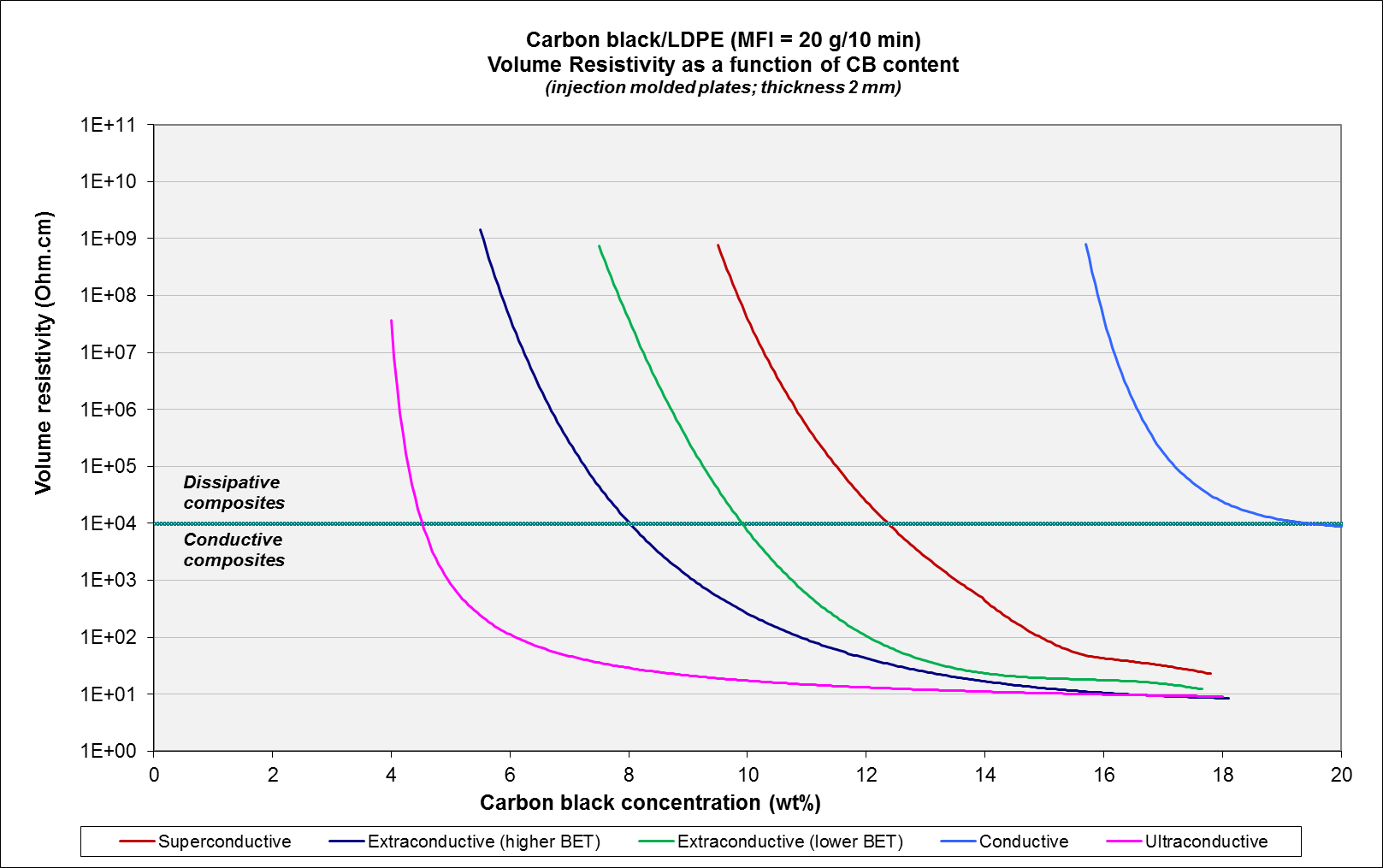

== Physical and chemical characteristics of electroconductive carbon black ==
=== Structure ===
Carbon black is essentially formed out of primary carbon, but its structure is much less arranged than that of, for example, graphite. Carbon black exists in the form of discrete particles, however, during the production process its spherical particles, also called primary particles, cluster (aggregate) into chains or clusters. These aggregates then form the smallest carbon black units. They define what is known as the primary structure. Primary structure is characterized by the following: size of the primary particles, surface size, size and structure of the aggregates or chemical "composition" of the carbon black surface. These characteristics determine other carbon black features, such as adsorption properties, density, electrical conductivity, and absorption of UV radiation or visible light.

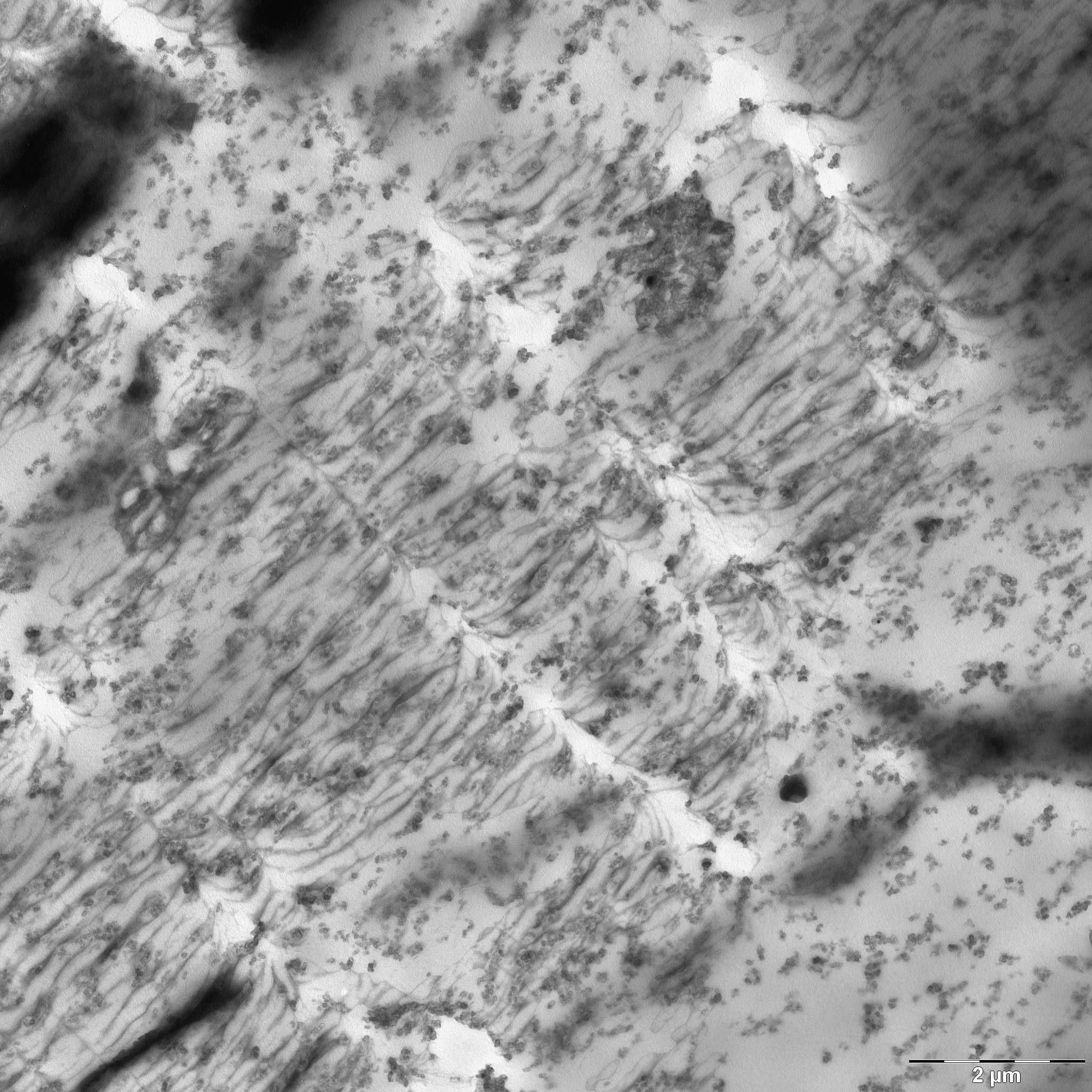
Incorporated electroconductive carbon black in the polypropylene matrix

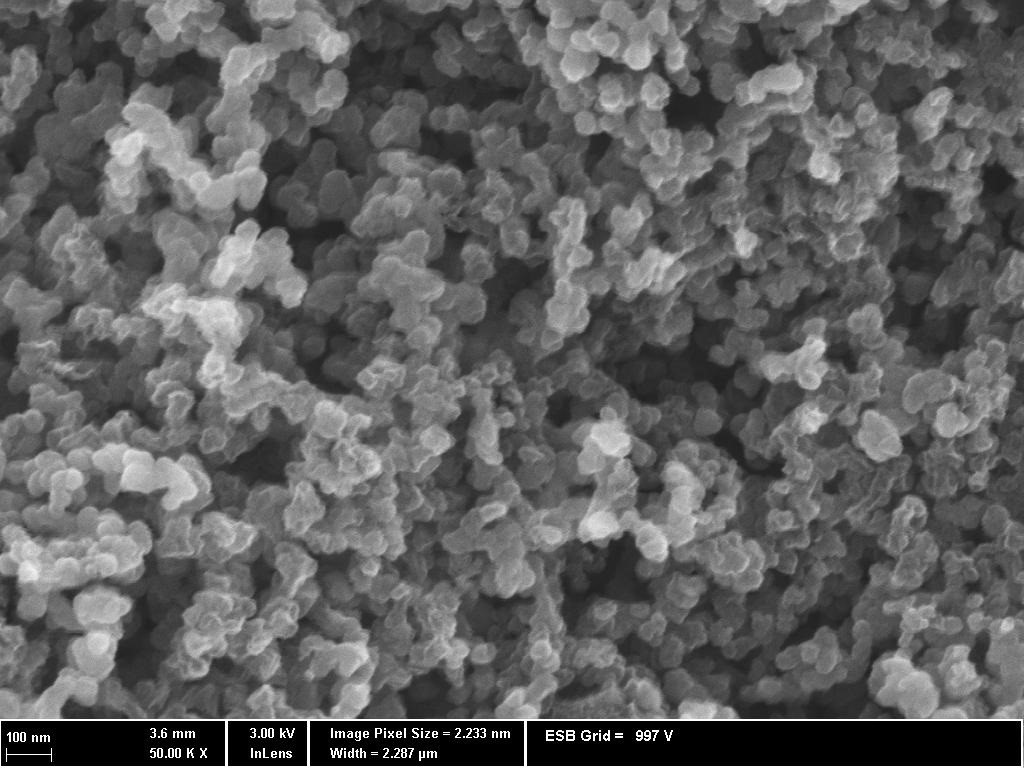
Electroconductive carbon black – Structure 1

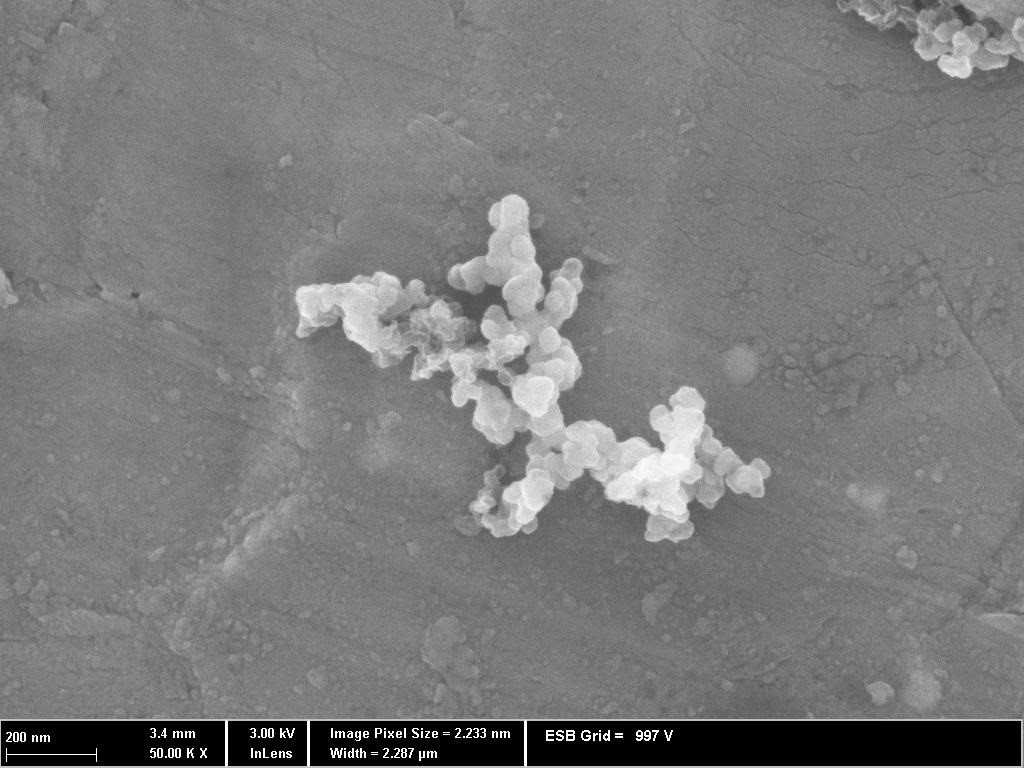
Electroconductive carbon black – Structure 2

=== Surface ===
The most important characteristic of carbon black is the size of its primary particles and the related surface area. The size of the primary particles describes the size of individual spherical particles that form a primary structure. The size of individual particles is determined using an electron microscope. It has been ascertained that the smaller the particles, the greater the size of their surface. Carbon black particle size is between 10 and 100 nm, while the surface particle size is between 20 and 1,500 m^{2}/g. Generally speaking, small carbon black particles with a high surface area are darker, have higher viscosity and lower wettability, are harder to disperse, retain greater conductivity and absorb UV radiation well.

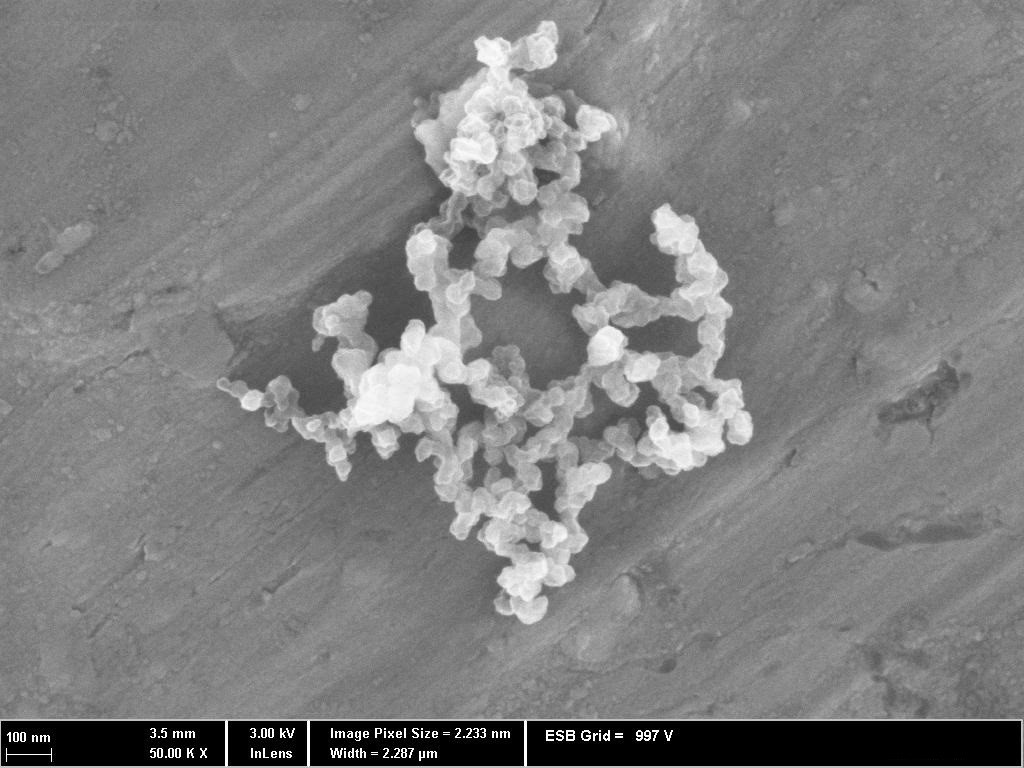
Electroconductive carbon black – Structure 3

=== Texture ===
Another significant characteristic of carbon black is its structure and the size of its aggregates. The size and complexity of the aggregate structure is determined by the volume of the carbon black spherical primary particles, which cluster together during the production process. The highly complex carbon black structure consists of branched chains with many secondarily created spaces in the aggregate. On the other hand, aggregate structure that is developed only a little represents smaller clusters of the spherical particles and thus also smaller spaces inside of the aggregate. The aggregate structure does not depend on the size of the particles. It has been established that particles of the same size can have aggregates with completely different structures. Generally speaking, carbon black that has a highly developed and complex structure is easier to disperse, has lower wettability, higher electric conductivity and higher viscosity.

=== Surface characteristics ===
Yet another noteworthy characteristic is carbon black's chemical surface composition. Chemisorbed complexes containing oxygen, such as carboxylic, quinonic, or phenolic groups, appear on carbon black surfaces. These groups, which contain oxygen, can significantly affect chemical reactivity, wettability, carbon black catalytic characteristics, electric conductivity, etc.

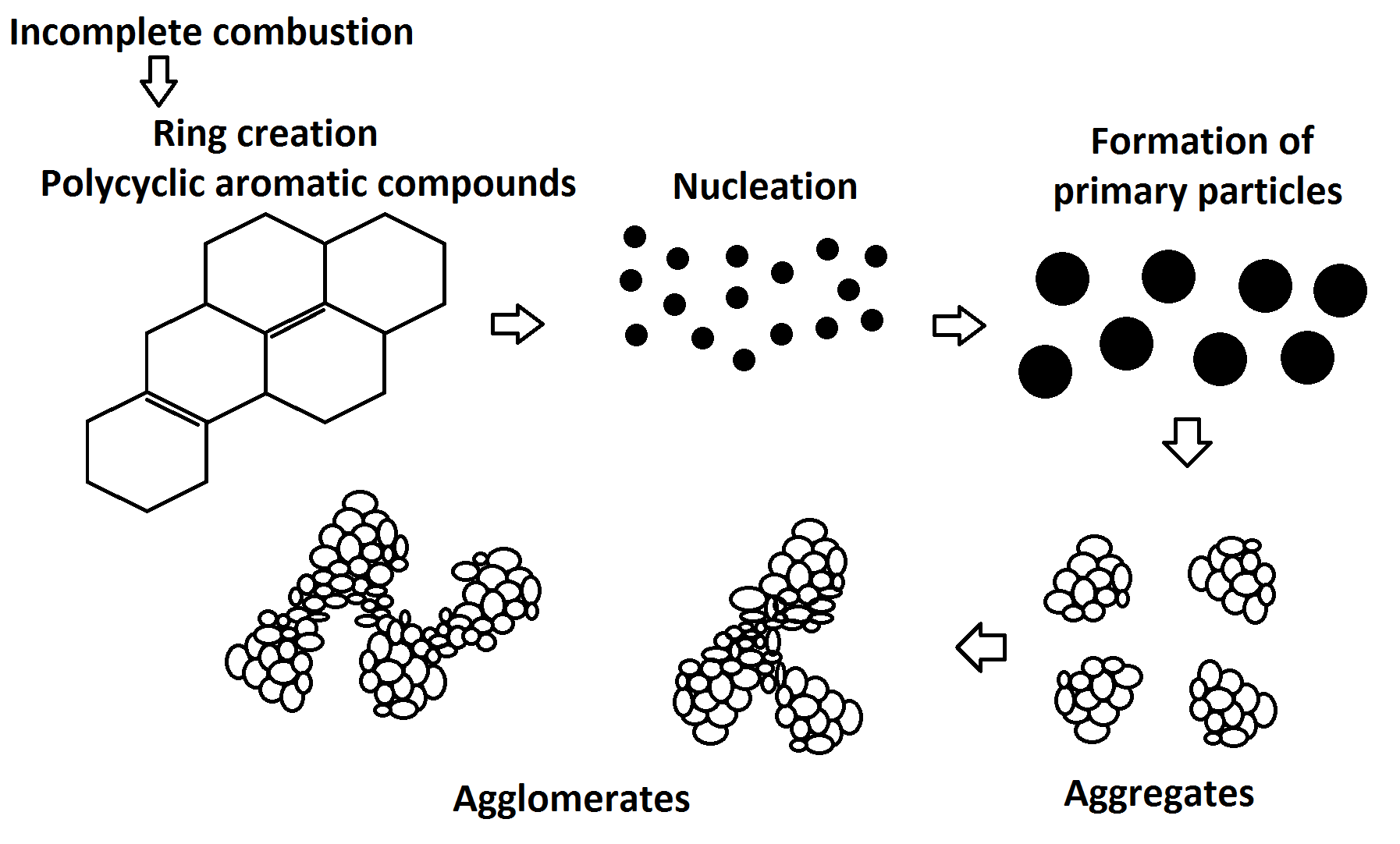

Picture: Diagram of carbon black structure and texture creation

== Applications ==
Composite applications

- polymers (compounds, concentrates)
- resins
- rubbers
- varnishes, paints, glues, such as Bare Conductive's Electric Paint, which can be used as a painted resistor element, a capacitive electrode, or as a conductor in designs that tolerate high resistivity when making circuits, as well as being painted onto gloves to allow people to use touchscreens in cold weather.

== Electroconductive carbon black producers ==
Some of the world's main producers of electroconductive carbon black include UNIPETROL (Chezacarb), CABOT Corporation (Vulcan), DEGUSSA (Printex), AKZO-Nobel (Ketjenblack), TIMCAL (Ensaco), BIRLA CARBON (Conductex), and ORION ENGINEERED CARBONS (XPB).

== See also ==
- Carbon black
- Unipetrol
- Cabot Corporation
- AkzoNobel
