= Carbon black =

Chemical compound

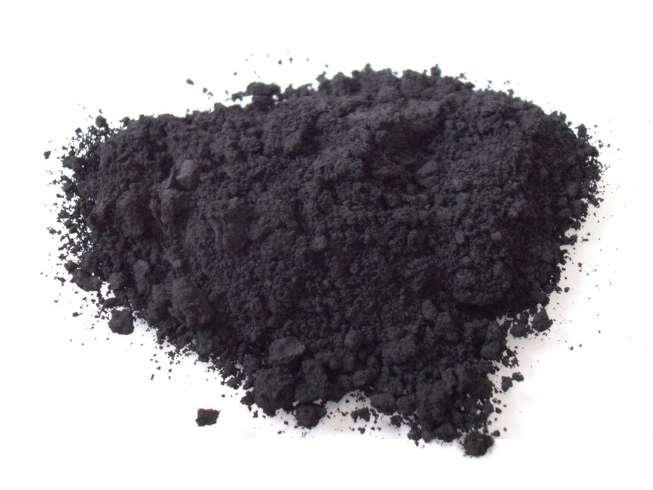

Names
- Other names: Acetylene black; Channel black; Furnace black; Lamp black; Thermal black; C.I. Pigment Black 6; Black 7984; E152; E153

Identifiers
CAS Number	1333-86-4
3D model (JSmol)	Interactive image
ECHA InfoCard	100.014.191
EC Number	215-609-9
E number	E152 (colours)
UNII	4XYU5U00C4
CompTox Dashboard (EPA)	DTXSID7051216
- SMILES: C

Properties
Chemical formula	C
Molar mass	12.011 g·mol^{−1}
Appearance	Black solid
Density	1.8–2.1 g/cm^{3} (20 °C)
Solubility in water	Practically insoluble

Hazards
- Lethal dose or concentration (LD, LC)
LD_{50} (median dose)	> 15400 mg/kg (oral rat); 3000 mg/kg (dermal, rabbit)
- Except where otherwise noted, data are given for materials in their standard state (at 25 °C [77 °F], 100 kPa). Infobox references

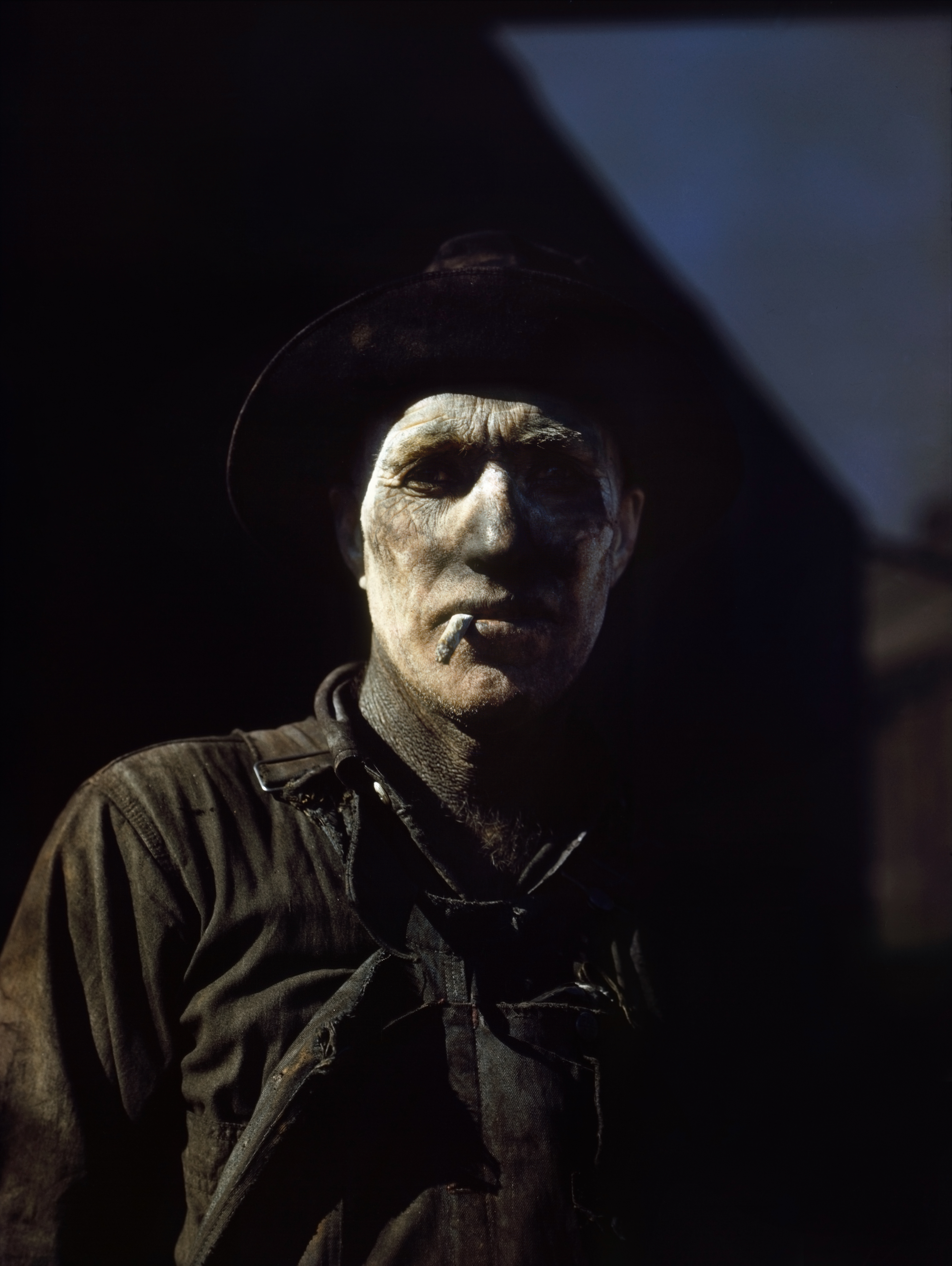
Worker at carbon black plant, 1942

Carbon black (with subtypes acetylene black, channel black, furnace black, lamp black and thermal black) is a material produced by the incomplete combustion of coal tar, vegetable matter, or petroleum products—including fuel oil, fluid catalytic cracking tar, and ethylene cracking—in a limited supply of air. Carbon black is a form of paracrystalline carbon that has a high surface-area-to-volume ratio, albeit lower than that of activated carbon. It is dissimilar to soot in its much higher surface-area-to-volume ratio and significantly lower (negligible and non-bioavailable) polycyclic aromatic hydrocarbon (PAH) content.

Carbon black is used as a colorant and reinforcing filler in tires and other rubber products and as a pigment and wear protection additive in plastics, paints, and ink pigment. It is used in the EU as a food colorant when produced from vegetable matter (E153). It was also assigned E number E152 in the hydrocarbon form, but has been banned in 1978. Both forms are banned in the US.

The current International Agency for Research on Cancer (IARC) evaluation is that, "Carbon black is possibly carcinogenic to humans (Group 2B)". Short-term exposure to high concentrations of carbon black dust may produce discomfort to the upper respiratory tract through mechanical irritation.

== Uses ==
The most common use (70%) of carbon black is as a reinforcing phase in automobile tires. Carbon black also helps conduct heat away from the tread and belt area of the tire, reducing thermal damage and increasing tire life. About 20% of world production goes into belts, hoses, and other non-tire rubber goods. The remaining 10% use of carbon black comes from pigment in inks, coatings, and plastics, as well as being used as a conductive additive in lithium-ion batteries. Its low cost makes it a common addition to cathodes and anodes and is considered a safe replacement to lithium metal in lithium-ion batteries.

Carbon black is added to polypropylene because it absorbs ultraviolet radiation, which otherwise causes the material to degrade. Carbon black particles are employed in some radar absorbent materials, in photocopier and laser printer toner, and in other inks and paints. The high tinting strength and stability of carbon black has provided use in coloring of resins and films. Carbon black has been used in various applications for electronics. A good electrical conductor, carbon black is used as a filler mixed in plastics, elastomer, films, adhesives, and paints. It is used as an antistatic additive agent in automobile fuel caps and pipes.

Carbon black from vegetable origin is used as a food coloring, known in Europe as additive E153. It is approved for use as additive 153 (carbon blacks or vegetable carbon) in Australia and New Zealand but has been banned in the US. As a color pigment it has been widely used for many years in food and beverage packaging. It is used in multi-layer UHT milk bottles in the US, parts of Europe and Asia, and South Africa, and in items like microwavable meal trays and meat trays in New Zealand.

The Canadian government's extensive review in 2011 concluded that carbon black could continue to be used in products – including food packaging for consumers – in Canada. This was because "in most consumer products carbon black is bound in a matrix and unavailable for exposure, for example as a pigment in plastics and rubbers" and "it is proposed that carbon black is not entering the environment in a quantity or concentrations or under conditions that constitute or may constitute a danger in Canada to human life or health."

Within Australasia, carbon black in packaging must comply with the requirements of either the EU or US packaging regulations. If any colorant is used, it must meet European partial agreement AP(89)1.

Total production was around 8,100,000 metric tons (8,900,000 short tons) in 2006. Global consumption, estimated at 13.2 million metric tons, valued at US$13.7 billion, in 2015, is expected to reach 13.9 million metric tons, valued at US$14.4 billion in 2016. Global consumption is forecast to maintain a compound annual growth rate of 5.6% between 2016 and 2022, reaching 19.2 million metric tons, valued at US$20.4 billion, by 2022.

While distinct from soot and similar particulates, carbon black can be used as a model compound for diesel soot to better understand how diesel soot behaves under various reaction conditions. Carbon black and diesel soot have some similar properties such as particle sizes, densities, and copolymer adsorption abilities that contribute to them having similar behaviours under various reactions such as oxidation experiments.

=== Reinforcing filler ===
The highest volume use of carbon black is as a reinforcing filler in rubber products, especially tires. While a pure gum vulcanization of styrene-butadiene has a tensile strength of no more than 2 MPa and negligible abrasion resistance, compounding it with 50% carbon black by weight improves its tensile strength and wear resistance as shown in the table below. It is used often in the aerospace industry in elastomers for aircraft vibration control components such as engine mounts.

Certain types of carbon black used in tires, plastics and paints
Name	Abbrev.	ASTM desig.	Particle Size nm	Tensile strength MPa	Relative laboratory abrasion	Relative roadwear abrasion
Super Abrasion Furnace	SAF	N110	20–25	25.2	1.35	1.25
Intermediate SAF	ISAF	N220	24–33	23.1	1.25	1.15
High Abrasion Furnace	HAF	N330	28–36	22.4	1.00	1.00
Easy Processing Channel	EPC	N300	30–35	21.7	0.80	0.90
Fast Extruding Furnace	FEF	N550	39–55	18.2	0.64	0.72
High Modulus Furnace	HMF	N660	49–73	16.1	0.56	0.66
Semi-Reinforcing Furnace	SRF	N770	70–96	14.7	0.48	0.60
Fine Thermal	FT	N880	180–200	12.6	0.22	–
Medium Thermal	MT	N990	250–350	9.8	0.18	–

Practically all rubber products where tensile and abrasion wear properties are important use carbon black. Where physical properties are important but colors other than black are desired, such as white tennis shoes, precipitated or fumed silica has been substituted for carbon black. Silica-based fillers are also gaining market share in automotive tires because they provide better trade-off for fuel efficiency and wet handling due to a lower rolling loss. Traditionally silica fillers had worse abrasion wear properties, but the technology has gradually improved to a point where they can match carbon black abrasion performance.

=== Pigment ===
Carbon black (Color Index International, PBK-7) is the name of a common black pigment, traditionally produced from charring organic materials such as wood or bone. It appears black because it reflects very little light in the visible part of the spectrum, with an albedo near zero. The actual albedo varies depending on the source material and method of production. It is known by a variety of names, each of which reflects a traditional method for producing carbon black:

- Ivory black was traditionally produced by charring bones or ivory.
- Vine black was traditionally produced by charring desiccated grape vines and stems.
- Lamp black was traditionally produced by collecting soot from oil lamps.

All of these types of carbon black were used extensively as paint pigments since prehistoric times. Rembrandt, Johannes Vermeer, Anthony van Dyck, and more recently, Paul Cézanne, Pablo Picasso, and Édouard Manet employed carbon black pigments in their paintings. A typical example is Manet's "Music in the Tuileries", where the black dresses and the men's hats are painted in ivory black. Newer methods of producing carbon black have largely superseded these traditional sources. For artisanal purposes, carbon black produced by any means remains common.

=== Lithium-ion batteries ===
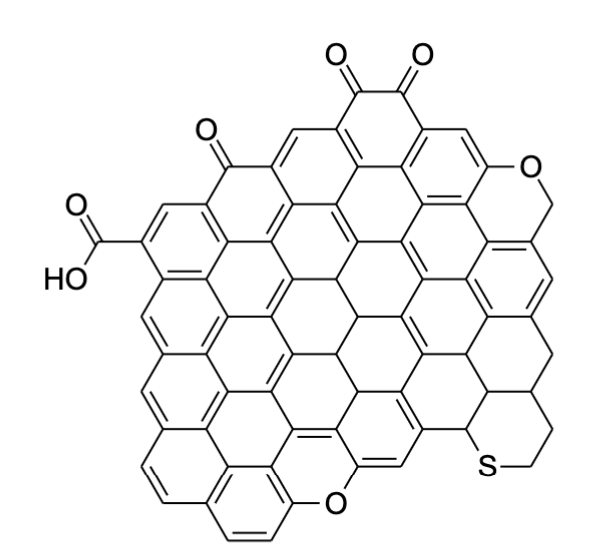
The generic structure of carbon black

Carbon black is a common conductive additive for lithium-ion batteries as the particles have small sizes and a large specific surface areas (SSA) which allow for the additive to be well distributed throughout the cathode or anode in addition to being cheap and long-lasting. Unlike graphite, which is one of the other common materials used in chargeable batteries, carbon black consists of crystal lattices that are further apart and promotes Li^{+} intercalation because it allows more pathways for lithium storage.

Carbon black has a low density that allows for a large volume of it to be dispersed so that its conductive effects are applied evenly throughout the battery. Furthermore, its arrangement of randomly distributed graphite-like crystals improves battery stability because of the decrease in the potential barrier of lithium intercalation into graphite, which ultimately affects the performance of cathodes.

While carbon black is lightweight and well dispersed throughout the battery and increases the conductive performance of batteries, it also contains oxygen containing hydrophilic functional groups that can cause side reactions to occur in the battery and lead to the decomposition of electrolyte. Graphitization (heating) of carbon black can thermally decompose the hydrophilic functional groups and thus increase the cycle life of the battery which maintains the conductive abilities of carbon black while mitigating the damage that can be caused to batteries by hydrophilic functional groups.

Half cells created with heavy graphitization, light graphitization, and no graphitization showed that the cell created with heavy graphitization had a stable cycle life of 320 cycles, the cell with light graphitization showed a stable cycle life of 200 cycles, and the cell with no graphitization showed a stable cycle life of 160 cycles.

== Surface and surface chemistry ==
All carbon blacks have chemisorbed oxygen complexes (i.e., carboxylic, quinonic, lactonic, phenolic groups and others) on their surfaces to varying degrees depending on the conditions of manufacture. These surface oxygen groups are collectively referred to as volatile content. It is also known to be a non-conductive material due to its volatile content.

The coatings and inks industries prefer grades of carbon black that are acid-oxidized. Acid is sprayed in high-temperature dryers during the manufacturing process to change the inherent surface chemistry of the black. The amount of chemically-bonded oxygen on the surface area of the black is increased to enhance performance characteristics.

== Safety ==
=== Carcinogenicity ===
Carbon black is considered possibly carcinogenic to humans and classified as a Group 2B carcinogen because there is sufficient evidence in experimental animals with inadequate evidence in human epidemiological studies. The evidence of carcinogenicity in animal studies comes from two chronic inhalation studies and two intratracheal instillation studies in rats, which showed significantly elevated rates of lung cancer in exposed animals. An inhalation study on mice did not show significantly elevated rates of lung cancer in exposed animals.

Epidemiologic data comes from three cohort studies of carbon black production workers. Two studies, from the United Kingdom and Germany, with over 1,000 workers in each study group showed elevated mortality from lung cancer. A third study of over 5,000 carbon black workers in the United States did not show elevated mortality. Newer findings of increased lung cancer mortality in an update from the UK study suggest that carbon black could be a late-stage carcinogen. However, a more recent and larger study from Germany did not confirm this hypothesis.

=== Occupational safety ===
There are strict guidelines available and in place to ensure employees who manufacture carbon black are not at risk of inhaling unsafe doses of carbon black in its raw form. Respiratory personal protective equipment is recommended to properly protect workers from inhalation. The recommended type of respiratory protection varies depending on the concentration of carbon black used.

People can be exposed to carbon black in the workplace by inhalation and contact with the skin or eyes. The Occupational Safety and Health Administration has set the legal limit (permissible exposure limit) for carbon black exposure in the workplace at 3.5 mg/m^{3} over an 8-hour workday. The National Institute for Occupational Safety and Health has set a recommended exposure limit of 3.5 mg/m^{3} over an 8-hour workday. At levels of 1750 mg/m^{3}, carbon black is immediately dangerous to life or health.

== See also ==
- Electroconductive carbon black
- George Oenslager - early use of carbon black in rubber
- Jean-Baptiste Donnet - carbon black pioneer
- Joseph C. Krejci - carbon black pioneer
- Kværner process - production from hydrocarbons
- List of inorganic pigments
- Shungite - sometimes described as "carbon black"
- Siegfried Wolff - carbon black pioneer
- Vantablack
- William B. Wiegand - carbon black pioneer
