= Super black =

Highly light-absorbent surface treatment

Super black is a surface treatment developed at the National Physical Laboratory (NPL) in the United Kingdom. It absorbs approximately 99.6% of visible light at normal incidence, while conventional black paint absorbs about 97.5%. At other angles of incidence, super black is even more effective: at an angle of 45°, it absorbs 99.9% of light.

== Technology ==
The technology to create super black involves chemically etching a nickel-phosphorus alloy.

Applications of super black are in specialist optical instruments for reducing unwanted reflections. The disadvantage of this material is its low optical thickness, as it is a surface treatment. As a result, infrared light of a wavelength longer than a few micrometers penetrates through the dark layer and has much higher reflectivity. The reported spectral dependence increases from about 1% at 3 μm to 50% at 20 μm.

In 2009, a competitor to the super black material, Vantablack, was developed based on carbon nanotubes. It has a relatively flat reflectance in a wide spectral range.

In 2011, NASA and the US Army began funding research in the use of nanotube-based super black coatings in sensitive optics. Nanotube-based superblack arrays and coatings have recently become commercially available.

== See also ==
- Vantablack
- Emissivity
- Black hole
- Black body
