= Vertically aligned carbon nanotube arrays =

Type of synthetic microstructure

In materials science, vertically aligned carbon nanotube arrays (VANTAs) are a unique microstructure consisting of carbon nanotubes oriented with their longitudinal axis perpendicular to a substrate surface. These VANTAs effectively preserve and often accentuate the unique anisotropic properties of individual carbon nanotubes and possess a morphology that may be precisely controlled. VANTAs are consequently widely useful in a range of current and potential device applications.

== Synthesis ==
There are a handful of experimental technologies available to align a single or an array of CNTs along a pre-determined orientation. The techniques rely on different mechanisms and therefore are applicable to different situations. These techniques are categorized into two groups pertaining to when the alignment is achieved: (a) in-situ techniques where alignment is achieved during the CNT growth process and (b) ex-situ techniques where CNTs are originally grown in random orientations and alignment is achieved afterwards such as during the device integration process.

=== Thermal chemical vapor deposition ===
==== Growth mechanism ====
Thermal chemical vapor deposition is a common technique to grow aligned arrays of CNTs. In the CVD process, a hot carbonaceous gas decomposes on contact with catalytic surface (e.g. iron, cobalt, or nickel). Decomposition leaves behind elemental carbon which diffuses in or on the catalyst until nucleating nanotubes on certain crystallographic faces of catalysts. The size of catalyst particles controls the diameter of the resulting nanotubes. There are two primary growth models for the CVD growth of VANTAs: “tip-growth model” and the “base-growth model.”

==== Catalyst ====
The catalyst enables the pyrolysis of carbon and subsequent growth of VANTA. Catalysts are typically metals that have high carbon solubility at high temperatures and that exhibit a high carbon diffusion rate, such as iron (Fe), cobalt (Co), and nickel (Ni). Other transition metals such as copper (Cu), gold (Au), silver (Ag), platinum (Pt), and palladium (Pd) are also reported to catalyze CNT growth from various hydrocarbons but have lower carbon solubility and consequently lower growth rates. Solid organometallocenes such as ferrocene, cobaltocene, nickelocene are also common catalysts. It is found that the temperature and time of the thermal and reduction catalyst pre-treatment steps are crucial variables for optimized nanoparticle distribution with different average diameters, depending on the initial film thickness. For CNT growth by CVD, a sputtered thin film of catalyst (e.g. 1 nm of Fe) is applied. During heating, the film de-wets, creating islands of iron that then nucleate nanotubes. As the iron is mobile, islands can merge if left too long at the growth temperature before initiating nanotube growth. Annealing at the growth temperature reduces the site density #/mm2 and increases the diameter of the nanotubes. As the nanotubes grow from the catalyst islands, the crowding effects and van der Waals forces between other CNTs leave them no choice to grow in any direction but vertically to the substrate.

The height of vertically aligned CNTs varies with catalyst particle spacing as well. Reports have indicated that for vertically aligned arrays of CNT bundles, the CNTs grow longer when there are other CNTs growing near them, indicated by longer CNTs grown on larger catalyst particles or when catalyst particles are spaced close together. Choi et al. reported good morphology and dense distribution of VANTAs grown from Ni nano powders and magnetic fluids mixed in polyvinyl alcohol spin-coated on Si and alumina. Xiong et al. demonstrated that single crystal magnesium oxide (MgO) is a capable substrate for growing VANTAs as long as 2.2 mm when catalyzed with a Fe catalyst. It has also been demonstrated that applying a monolayer of Mo with a Co catalyst suppressed the broadening of the SWNT diameter distribution in the as-grown VANTA, while both the composition and amount of Co and Mo affected the catalytic activity.

==== Support ====
The substrate material, its surface morphology and textural properties greatly affect the resulting VANTA yield. Some examples of commonly used substrates in CVD are quartz, silicon, silicon carbide, silica, alumina, zeolite, CaCO_{3}, and magnesium oxide. Most substrates are coated with an underlayer consisting of 10–20 nm of alumina before depositing the catalyst. This regularizes the dewetting of the catalyst into islands of predictable size, and is a diffusion barrier between the substrate and the metal catalyst. Li et al. have produced VANTA consisting of Y-shaped carbon nanotubes by the pyrolysis of methane over cobalt- covered magnesium oxide catalyst on branched nanochannel alumina templates. Qu et al. used a pitch-based carbon fiber as a support for the growth of VANTA using a FePc carbon source. The resulting array propagates radially on the surface of the carbon fiber.

Zhong, et al. demonstrated the direct growth of VANTAs on metallic titanium (Ti) coatings with a Fe/Ti/Fe catalyst sputtered on SiO_{2}/Si wafers. Alvarez et al. reports the ability to spin-coat an alumoxane solution as a catalyst support for VANTA growths via CVD. After a conventional Fe catalyst was evaporated onto the spin-coated support, the resulting VANTA growth yield was similar to conventional Al_{2}O_{3} powder supports.

==== Carbon source ====
The carbon source for the CVD of VANTAs is most commonly a carbon gas such as methane, ethylene, acetylene, benzene, xylene, or carbon monoxide. Other examples of carbon precursors include cyclohexane, fullerene, methanol, and ethanol. The pyrolysis of these gases into carbon atoms varies based on the decomposition rate at growth temperatures, the carbon content of the gas molecules, and the growth catalyst. Linear hydrocarbons such as methane, ethylene, acetylene, thermally decompose into atomic carbons or linear dimers/trimers of carbon, and generally produce straight and hollow CNTs. On the other hand, cyclic hydrocarbons such as benzene, xylene, cyclohexane, fullerene, produce relatively curved/hunched CNTs with the tube walls often bridged inside. Aligned arrays of MWNTs have been synthesized through the catalytic decomposition of ferrocene-xylene precursor mixture onto quartz substrates at atmospheric pressure and relatively low temperature (~675 °C).

Eres et al. found that the addition of ferrocene into the gas stream by thermal evaporation concurrently with acetylene enhanced carbon nanotube growth rates and extend the VANTA thickness to 3.25 mm. Ferrocene was introduced into the gas stream by thermal evaporation concurrently with the flow of acetylene. Qu et al. reported a low-pressure CVD process on a SiO_{2}/Si wafer that produces a VANTA consisting of CNTs with curly entangled ends. During the pyrolytic growth of the VANTAs, the initially formed nanotube segments from the base growth process grew in random directions and formed a randomly entangled nanotube top layer to which the underlying straight nanotube arrays then emerged. Zhong et al. studied purely thermal CVD process for SWNT forests without an etchant gas, and demonstrated that acetylene is the main growth precursor, and the conversion of any feedstock to C_{2}H_{2} is of key importance to SWNT VANTA growth. A reactive etchant, such as water, atomic hydrogen, or hydroxyl radicals, can widen the SWNT forest deposition window but is not required in cold-wall reactors at low pressures.

Dasgupta et al. synthesized a free-standing macro-tubular VANTA with a spray pyrolysis of ferrocene-benzene solution in a nitrogen atmosphere, with the optimum condition for the formation of macro-tubular geometry was found to be 950 °C, 50 mg/ml ferrocene in benzene, 1.5 ml/min pumping rate of liquid precursor and 5 lpm of nitrogen gas flow rate.

==== Temperature ====
At a too low temperature, the catalyst atoms are not mobile enough to aggregate together into particles to nucleate and grow nanotubes and the catalytic decomposition of the carbon precursor may be too slow for the formation of nanotubes. If the temperature is too high, the catalyst becomes too mobile to form particles small enough to nucleate and grow CNTs. A typical range of growth temperatures amenable to the CVD growth of VANTA is 600–1200 °C. The individual CNT structure is impacted by the growth temperature; a low-temperature CVD (600–900 °C) yields MWCNTs, whereas high-temperature (900–1200 °C) reaction favors SWCNT since they have a higher energy of formation. A critical temperature exists for each CVD system where the growth rate plateaus at a maximum value.

The temperature dependence of the carbon nanotube growth with ferrocene exhibits a steep drop at high substrate temperatures and a loss of vertical alignment at 900 °C. Zhang et al. conducted VANTA growths on a series of Fe/Mo/vermiculite catalysts and reported that with the increasing growth temperature, the alignment of CNTs intercalated among vermiculites became worse.

==== Flow assisted growth ====
A key to high growth yields is a proper introduction of oxidative agents under the gas ambient so that the catalyst particle surfaces remain active for the longest possible period, which is presumably achieved by balancing the competition between amorphous carbon growth and sp^{2} graphitic crystal formation on the catalyst particles. Oxidants can not only remove or prevent amorphous carbon growth, but may also etch into graphite layers when used at higher than favorable concentrations. Hata et al. reported millimeter-scale vertically aligned 2.5 mm long SWCNTs using the water assisted ethylene CVD process with Fe/Al or aluminum oxide multilayers on Si wafers. It was proposed that controlled supply of steam into the CVD reactor acted as a weak oxidizer and selectively removed amorphous carbon without damaging the growing CNTs.

==== Field-assisted growth ====
Since CNTs are all electrically conductive they have a tendency to align with the electric field lines. Various methods have been developed to apply a strong enough electric field during the CNT growth process to achieve uniform alignment of CNTs based on this principle. The orientation of the aligned CNTs is mainly dependent on the length of CNTs and the electric field besides the thermal randomization and van der Waals forces. This technique has been employed to grow VANTAs by positively biasing the substrate during CVD growth.

Another modified approach to grow VANTAs is to control the orientation of ferromagnetic catalysts that have one crystallographic magnetic easy axis. The magnetic easy axis tends to be parallel to the magnetic field. As a result, an applied magnetic force can orient these magnetic catalytic nanoparticles, like catalytic iron nanoparticles and Fe_{3}O_{4} nanoparticles. Because only a certain nanocrystalline facet of catalytic nanoparticles is catalytically active and the diffusion rate of carbon atoms on the facet is the highest, the CNTs preferentially grow from the certain facet of the catalytic nanoparticles and the grown CNTs are oriented at a certain angle.

==== Individually addressable nanostructures ====
Carbon nanotubes can be grown on a modified substrate to allow separate electrical contacts to each nanostructure. This nanotube growth is accomplished by lithographically placing metal traces separated by insulator material, and connecting those traces to individual catalyst sites on the substrate surface. The nanotubes are then grown as normal with CVD and a series of reactions at the catalyst forms a single junction between a nanotube and a metal contact. The nanostructures can then be individually functionalized and their electrical responses measured individually without crosstalk and other bottlenecks that arise from array heterogeneity. This technique, which accomplishes precise placement and configuration of individual nanotubes, unlocks and enhances a wide range of applications for VANTA's: diagnostic testing for many analytes simultaneously, high energy density supercapacitors, field effect transistors, etc.

=== Plasma enhanced CVD ===
==== Growth mechanism ====
In plasma enhanced CVD (PECVD) processes, DC electric fields, radio-frequency electric fields, or microwaves produce plasmas to primarily lower the synthesis temperature of CNTs. At the same time, an electric field (DC or AC) is also produced over the substrate surface to direct CNT growth propagation. The DC-PECVD process for vertically aligned CNT arrays includes four basic steps: evacuation, heating, plasma generation, and cooling. A typical procedure is conducted at a pressure of 8 Torr in NH_{3} and at a growth temperature in the range of 450–600◦. As soon as the temperature and pressure are stabilized, a DC bias voltage of 450–650 V is applied to the gap between two electrodes to ignite an electrical discharge (plasma) over the sample. The growth time may vary from a couple of minutes to hours depending on the growth rate and desired CNT length. When the end of growth time is reached, the bias voltage is removed immediately to terminate the plasma.

Zhong et al. reported a novel point-arc microwave plasma CVD apparatus employed to SWNTs on Si substrates coated with a sandwich-like nano-layer structure of 0.7 nm Al_{2}O_{3}/0.5 nm Fe/ 5–70 nm Al_{2}O_{3} by conventional high frequency sputtering. The growth of extremely dense and vertically aligned SWNTs with an almost constant growth rate of 270 µm/h within 40 min at a temperature as low as 600 °C was demonstrated for the first time and the volume density of the as-grown SWNT films is as higher as 66 kg/m^{3}.

==== Catalyst ====
The formation of a dense and relatively uniform layer of catalyst nanoparticles is also essential for vertically aligned SWCNT growth vertically aligned SWCNTs using the PECVD method. Amaratunga et al. reported the growth of vertically aligned CNTs using a direct current PECVD technique with a Ni and Co catalyst system. Their results show that the alignment of vertically aligned CNTs depends on the electric field and that the growth rate can be changed depending on the CNT diameter, which reaches a maximum as a function of growth temperature. VANTAs consisting of SWNTs have been grown as long as 0.5 cm.

==== Support ====
For PECVD processes, the substrate must be chemically stable under the plasma which is rich of H-species. Some weakly bonded oxides such as indium oxide can be quickly reduced in this plasma and is therefore usually not applicable as the substrate or underlayer. The substrate must also be electrically conductive to sustain a continuous DC current flow through its surface where the CNTs grow from. Most metals and semiconductors are very good substrate materials, and insulating substrates can be first coated with a conductive layer to work properly to support PECVD VANTA growth.

==== Carbon source ====
C_{2}H_{2} is typically introduced to trigger the CNT growth during PECVD of VANTAs. The flow rate ratio of NH_{3}:C_{2}H_{2} is usually around 4:1 to minimize the amorphous carbon formation. Behr et al. studied the effect of hydrogen on the catalyst nanoparticles during the PECVD of VANTAs, and demonstrated that at H_{2}-to-CH_{4} ratios of about 1 iron catalyst nanoparticles are converted to Fe_{3}C and well-graphitized nanotubes grow from elongated Fe_{3}C crystals. H_{2}-to-CH_{4} ratios greater than 5 in the feed gas result in high hydrogen concentrations in the plasma and strongly reducing conditions, which prevents the conversion of Fe to Fe_{3}C and cause poorly-graphitized nanofibers to grow with thick walls.

==== Temperature ====
One of the major advantages of using PECVD growth techniques is the low growth temperature. The ionization of the neutral hydrocarbon molecules inside the plasma facilitates the breaking of the C–H bonds and lowers the activation energy of the CNT growth to be about 0.3 eV as opposed to the 1.2 eV needed for thermal CVD processes.

=== Electrophoretic deposition ===
CNT solutions can form VANTAs through alignment along DC or AC electric field lines. The CNTs are polarized in the suspension by the electric field because of dielectric mismatch between CNTs and the liquid. The polarization moment rotates the CNTs toward the direction of electric field lines, therefore aligning them in a common direction. After being aligned, the CNTs are taken out with the substrates and dried to form functional VANTAs.

=== Mechanical strain ===
Randomly oriented CNTs on a substrate can be stretched to straighten and detangle the film by breaking the substrate and pulling the ends apart. The aligned CNTs are parallel to each other and perpendicular to the crack. The stretching method can macroscopically align the CNTs while not providing deterministic control over individual CNT alignment or position during assembly.

== Current applications ==
=== Field-emission devices ===
CNTs have high aspect ratios (length divided by diameter) and induce very high local electric field intensities around the tips. Field emission in solids occurs in intense electric fields and is strongly dependent on the work function of the emitting material. In a parallel-plate arrangement, the macroscopic field Emacro between the plates is given by E_{macro} = V/d, where d is the plate separation and V the applied voltage. If a sharp object is created on a plate, then the local field Elocal at its apex is greater than Emacro and can be related to: E_{local}=γ×E_{macro} The parameter γ is called the field-enhancement factor and basically determined by the shape of the object. Typical field-enhancement factors ranging from 30,000 to 50,000 can be obtained from individual CNTs, therefore making VANTAs one of the best electron-emitting materials.

=== Blackbody absorber ===
VANTAs offer a unique light absorbing surface due to their extremely low index of refraction and the nanoscale surface roughness of the aligned CNTs. Yang et al. demonstrated that low-density VANTAs exhibit an ultralow diffuse reflectance of 1 × 10–7 with a corresponding integrated total reflectance of 0.045%. Although VANTA black coatings must be directly transferred or grown on substrates, unlike black coatings consisting of random networks of CNTs that may be processed into CNT paints, they are the considered the blackest man-made material on earth.

VANTA blackbody absorbers are thus useful as stray light absorbers to improve the resolution of sensitive spectroscopes, telescopes, microscopes, and optical sensing devices. Several commercial optical black coating products such as Vantablack and adVANTA nanotube optical blacks have been produced from VANTA coatings. VANTA absorbers may also increase the absorption of heat in materials used in concentrated solar power technology, as well as military applications such as thermal camouflage. Visual displays of VANTA absorbers have generated interest by artists as well seeking to benefit from the quenching of shadows from rough surface. Recently, Vantablack was used by artist Asif Khan to create the Hyundai Pavilion in Pyeongchang for the 2018 Winter Olympics.

=== Carbon fiber ropes ===
VANTAs can be processed through volatile solutions or twisted to condense into spun CNT yarns or ropes. Jiang et al. demonstrated a spinning and twisting method that forms a CNT yarn from a VANTA that gives rise to both a round cross-section and a tensile strength of around 1 GPa. The tensile strengths of CNT yarns spun from ultra-long CNT arrays of 1 mm height can range from 1.35 to 3.3 GPa.

=== Unidirectional Sheets ===
Lui et al. describe ways to control the physical properties of sheets spun from CNT arrays, including catalyst film thickness, to control tube diameter distribution and growth time to control tube length. These properties can be used to control the electrical and optical properties of the sheet spun from the array. The sheets may be useful in scientific applications, such as the polarization of light through the sheet (the degree of polarization can also be controlled by the temperature of the sheet).

=== Adhesive films ===
Biomimicry studies directed towards replicating the adhesion of gecko feet on smooth surfaces have reported success utilizing VANTA as a dry adhesive film. Qu et al. was able to demonstrate VANTA films that exhibited macroscopic adhesive forces of ~100 newtons per square centimeter, which is almost 10 times that of a gecko foot. This was achieved by tuning the growth conditions of the VANTA to form curls at the end of the CNTs, which provide stronger interfacial interactions even with a smooth surface. Qu et al. also demonstrated that the adhesive properties were less temperature sensitive than superglue and scotch tape.

=== Gas sensor ===
VANTAs allow the development of novel sensors and/or sensor chips without the need for direct manipulation of individual nanotubes. The aligned nanotube structure further provides a large well-defined surface area and the capacity for modifying the carbon nanotube surface with various transduction materials to effectively enhance the sensitivity and to broaden the scope of analytes to be detected. Wei et al. reported a gas sensor fabricated by partially covering a VANTA with a polymer coating top-down along their tube length by depositing a droplet of polymer solution (e.g., poly(vinyl acetate), PVAc, polyisoprene, PI) onto the nanotube film, inverting the composite film as a free-standing film, and then sputter-coating two strip electrodes of gold across the nanotube arrays that were protruding from the polymer matrix. The flexible VANTA device was demonstrated to successfully sense chemical vapors through monitoring conductivity changes caused by the charge-transfer interaction with gas molecules and/or the inter-tube distance changes induced by polymer swelling via gas absorption. To date, CNTs have shown sensitivities toward gases such as NH_{3}, NO_{2}, H_{2}, C_{2}H_{4}, CO, SO_{2}, H_{2}S, and O_{2}.

=== Biological sensor ===
VANTAs act as forests of molecular wires to allow electrical communication between the underlying electrode and a biological entity. The main advantages of VANTAs are the nanosize of the CNT-sensing element and the corresponding small amount of material required for a detectable response. The well-aligned CNT arrays have been employed to work as ribonucleic acid (RNA) sensors, enzymes sensors, DNA sensors, and even protein sensors. Similar VANTAs of MWNTs, grown on platinum substrates, are useful for amperometric electrodes where the oxygenated or functionalized open-ends of nanotubes are used for the immobilization of biological species, while the platinum substrate provides the signal transduction. To increase the selectivity and sensitivity of amperometric biosensors, artificial mediators and permselective coatings are often used in the biosensor fabrication. Artificial mediators are used to shuttle electrons between the enzyme and the electrode to allow operation at low potentials. Gooding et al. demonstrated that shortened SWNTs can be aligned normal to an electrode by self-assembly and act as molecular wires to allow electrical communication between the underlying electrode and redox proteins covalently attached to the ends of the SWNTs. The high rate of electron transfer through the nanotubes to redox proteins is clearly demonstrated by the similarity in the rate constant for electron transfer to MP-11 regardless of whether SWNTs are present or not.

=== Thermal interface materials ===
VANTA interfaces are more thermally conductive than conventional thermal interface materials at the same temperatures because phonons propagate easily along the highly thermally conductive CNTs and thus heat is transported in one direction along the alignment of the CNTs. The distribution and alignment of the thermally conductive CNT fillers are important factors to affect the phonon transport. Huang et al. demonstrated a thermally conductive composite shows an enhancement of 0.65W/m/K with a 0.3wt% loading of VANTA, whereas the enhanced thermal conductivity of a composite with of 0.3 wt% loading of randomly dispersed CNT is below 0.05W/m/K. Tong et al. reported that CNT arrays can be used effectively as thermal interface materials (TIM) due to their high conductance, which they report as ~10^5 W/m^2/K. Thermal interface materials are materials that can enhance thermal conduction at surfaces by having high thermal conductivities; it is useful to have materials which can be designed to fit any geometry. Additionally, the geometry of VANTA systems allows for anisotropic heat transfer. Ivanov et al. found that anisotropic heat transfer could be achieved with VANTAs: they achieved thermal diffusivities up to 2.10.2 cm^2/s, anisotropy ratios up to 72, and found thermal conductivities greater than those of materials used in microelectronics today. Heat transfer properties rely heavily on the structure of the array, so the methods used to manufacture the product must be uniform and reproducible for widespread use. Defects in the structure can also drastically disrupt the heat transfer properties of the material.

=== Solar cells ===
Vertically aligned periodic arrays of carbon nanotubes (CNTs) are used to create topographically enhanced light-trapping photovoltaic cells. The CNTs form the back contact of the device and serve as a scaffold to support the photoactive heterojunction. Molecular beam epitaxy is used to deposit CdTe and CdS as the p/n-type materials and ion-assisted deposition is used to deposit a conformal coating of indium-tin oxide as the transparent top contact. Photocurrent produced “per cm2 of footprint” for the CNT-based device is 63 times that of a commercially available planar single crystal silicon device.

=== Transistors ===
VANTAs of SWNTs with perfectly linear geometries are applicable as high-performance p- and n-channel transistors and unipolar and complementary logic gates. The excellent properties of the devices derive directly from a complete absence, to within experimental uncertainties, of any defects in the arrays, as defined by tubes or segments of tubes that are misaligned or have nonlinear shapes. The large number of SWNTs enables good device-level performance characteristics and good device-to-device uniformity, even with SWNTs that are electronically heterogeneous. Measurements on p- and n-channel transistors that involve as many as about 2,100 SWNTs reveal device-level mobilities and scaled transconductance approaching about 1,000 cm2 V-1 s-1 and $3,000 S m-1, respectively, and with current outputs of up to about 1 A in devices that use interdigitated electrodes.

=== Low-dielectric material ===
The low κ materials with low relative dielectric constants are employed as the insulating layers in integrated circuits to reduce the coupling capacitance. The relative dielectric constant of electrically insulating layers can be reduced further by introducing cavities into the low-κ materials. If elongated and oriented pores are used, it is possible to reduce significantly the effective κ value without increasing the proportion of the cavity volume in a dielectric. The CNTs in VANTAs have a high aspect ratio and can be used to introduce elongated, oriented pores into a low-κ dielectric to further reduce the effective κ value of the dielectric.

=== Catalyst support ===
Palladium supported on vertically aligned multi-walled carbon nanotubes (Pd/VA-CNTs) is used as catalyst for the C-C coupling reactions of p-iodonitrobenzene with styrene and ethyl acrylate under microwave irradiation. Pd/VA-CNTs catalyst exhibits higher activity compared to Pd supported on activated charcoal, under the same reaction conditions. Due to the microwave irradiation, the kinetics of the reaction are strongly accelerated compared to that obtained with a traditional heating mode. The macroscopic form of aligned CNTs support allows an easy recovery of the catalyst, avoiding costly post-reaction separation processes. In addition, the interaction between the active phase and the support leads to negligible leaching of palladium during recycling tests. The observed results indicate that Pd/CNTs is a recyclable and stable heterogeneous catalytic system.

=== Fuel cell ===
Fuel cells are made up of three sandwiched segments: an anode, an electrolyte, and a cathode, in a reaction cell where electricity is produced inside the fuel cells through the reactions between an external fuel and an oxidant in the presence of an electrolyte. The anode hosts a catalyst that oxidizes the fuel, turning the fuel into positively charged ions and negatively charged electrons. This fuel is typically hydrogen, hydrocarbons, and alcohols. The electrolyte blocks the transportation of electrons while conducting ions. The ions traveling through the electrolyte are re-united on the cathode with the electrons passing through a load during a reaction with an oxidant to produce water or carbon dioxide. Ideal anode supports for the deposition of catalytic nanoparticles are porous conductive materials to maximize the electrocatalytic activity. VANTAs are therefore ideal materials due to their intrinsic high conductivity, high surface area, and stability in most fuel cell electrolytes. A typical catalyst deposited on VANTA anodes is platinum, which can be electrodeposited on the individual CNTs of the VANTA. The electrocatalytic activity at the anode is optimal when the Pt particles are uniformly dispersed within the VANTA.

Gong et al. reported that VANTAs doped with nitrogen can act as a metal-free electrode with a much better electrocatalytic activity, long-term operation stability, and tolerance to crossover effect than platinum for oxygen reduction in alkaline fuel cells. In air-saturated 0.1 molar potassium hydroxide, a steady-state output potential of –80 millivolts and a current density of 4.1 milliamps per square centimeter at –0.22 volts was observed, as compared to –85 millivolts and 1.1 milliamps per square centimeter at –0.20 volts for a platinum-carbon electrode. The incorporation of electron-accepting nitrogen atoms in the conjugated nanotube carbon plane appears to impart a relatively high positive charge density on adjacent carbon atoms. This effect, coupled with aligning the nitrogen-doped CNTs, provides a four-electron pathway for the oxygen reduction reactions on VANTAs with a superb performance.

=== Supercapacitors ===
Like ordinary capacitors, VANTA supercapacitors and electromechanical actuators typically comprise two electrodes separated by an electronically insulating material, which is ionically conducting in electrochemical devices. The capacitance for an ordinary planar sheet capacitor inversely depends on the inter-electrode separation. In contrast, the capacitance for an electrochemical device depends on the separation between the charge on the electrode and the countercharge in the electrolyte. Because this separation is about a nanometer for CNTs in VANTA electrodes, as compared with the micrometer or larger separations in ordinary dielectric capacitors, very large capacitances result from the high CNT surface area accessible to the electrolyte. These capacitances (typically 15–200 F/g, depending on the surface area of the nanotube array) result in large amounts of charge injection when only a few volts are applied.

Futaba et al. reported a technique to form super-capacitors from a VANTA flattened by settling the erect CNTs by wetting them with a liquid. The capacitance of the SWNT solid EDLC was estimated as 20 F g^{−1} from the discharge curves of cells charged at 2.5V for a two-electrode cell, and corresponds to 80 F g^{−1} for a three-electrode cell. The energy density (W = CV^{2}/2) was estimated to be 69.4 W h kg^{−1} (from 80 F g^{−1}) when normalized to the single electrode weight.

In Pitkänen et al., on-chip energy storage is demonstrated using architectures of highly aligned vertical carbon nanotubes acting as supercapacitors, capable of providing large device capacitances. The efficiency of these structures is further increased by incorporating electrochemically active nanoparticles such as MnO_{x} to form pseudocapacitive architectures thus enhancing areal specific capacitance to 37 mF/cm^{2}.

=== Batteries ===
Unlike in ultracapacitors where the solvent of the electrolyte is not involved in the charge storage mechanism, the solvent of the electrolyte contributes to the solid–electrolyte interphase in batteries. The Li-ion batteries usually consist of an active carbon anode, a lithium–cobalt oxide cathode, and an organic electrolyte. In order to obtain better electrode performance than networks of random CNTs and CNT composites, VANTAs are used as to provide better electron transport and higher surface area.

Nanostructured materials are gaining increased attention because of their potential to mitigate current electrode limitations. However, it is possible to use of vertically aligned multi-walled carbon nanotubes (VA-MWNTs) as the active electrode material in lithium-ion batteries. At low specific currents, these VA-MWNTs have shown high reversible specific capacities (up to 782 mAh g−1 at 57 mA g−1). This value is twice that of the theoretical maximum for graphite and ten times more than their non-aligned equivalent. Interestingly, at very high discharge rates, the VA-MWNT electrodes retain a moderate specific capacity due to their aligned nature (166 mAh g−1 at 26 A g−1). These results suggest that VA-MWNTs are good candidates for lithium-ion battery electrodes which require high rate capability and capacity.
