= Vantablack =

Synthetic material, one of the darkest substances known

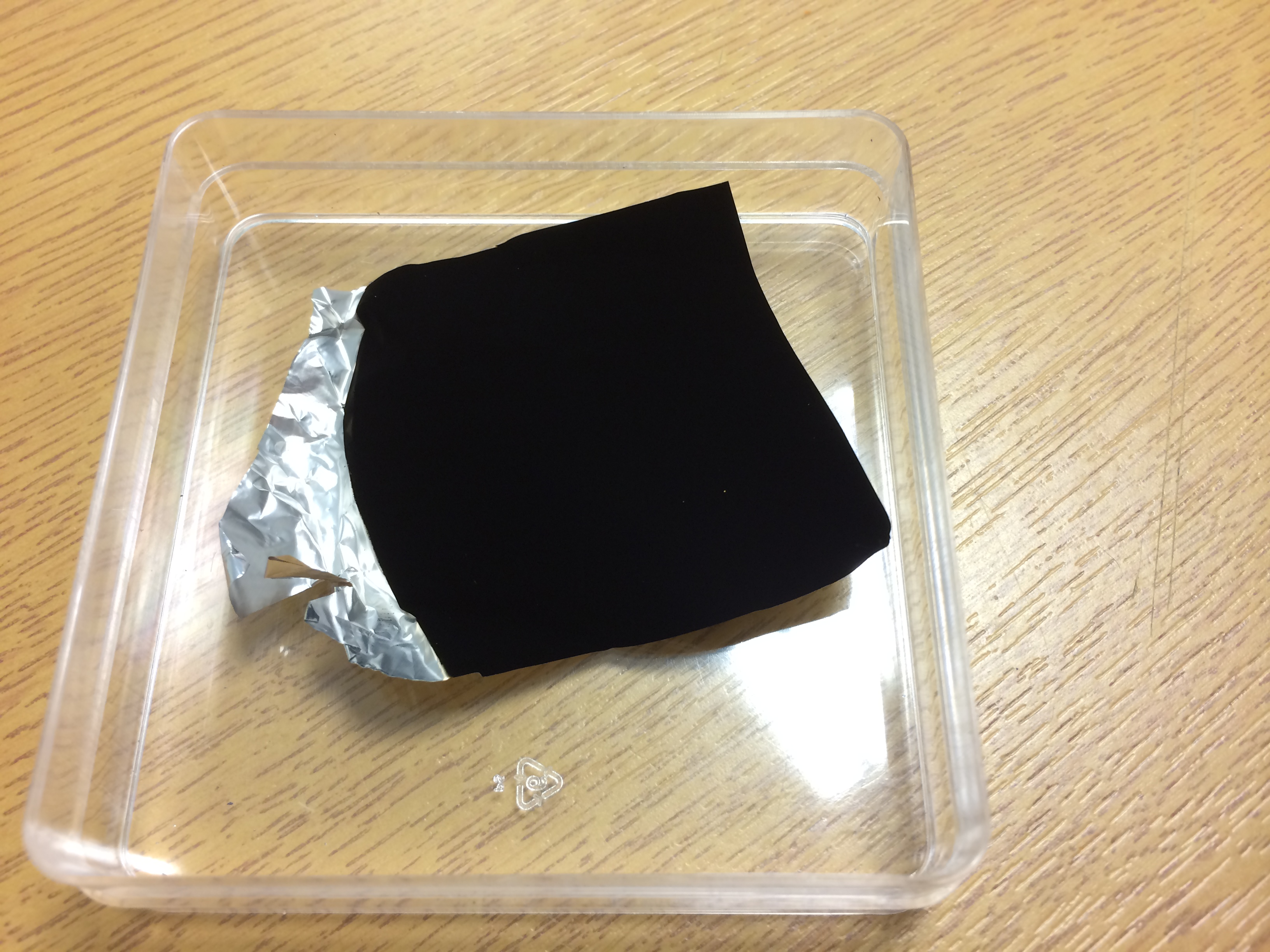
- Vantablack grown on metal foil

Names
- Other names: Activated carbon high density skeleton; Multiwalled carbon nanotube (MWCNT); Vantablack S-VIS; Vantablack S-IR

Identifiers
| CAS Number | 308068-56-6 |

Properties
| Chemical formula | C |
| Appearance | Solid black coating |
| Density | 2.5 mg/cm^{3} |
| Melting point | >3,000 °C (5,430 °F; 3,270 K) |
| Solubility in water | Insoluble |

Hazards
- GHS labelling
| Pictograms | (GHS07: Exclamation mark) |
| Signal word | Warning |
| Hazard statements | H319, H335 |
| Precautionary statements | P261, P281, P305+P351+P338 |
- NIOSH (US health exposure limits)
| REL (Recommended) | <1 μg/m^{3} over an 8-hour TWA |
| Safety data sheet (SDS) | CAS 308068-56-6 |
- Except where otherwise noted, data are given for materials in their standard state (at 25 °C [77 °F], 100 kPa). Infobox references

Vantablack is a class of super-black coatings with total hemispherical reflectances (THR) below 1% in the visible spectrum. The name is a compound of the acronym VANTA (vertically aligned nanotube arrays) and black.

The original Vantablack coating was grown from a chemical vapour deposition process (CVD) and is claimed to be the "world's darkest material", absorbing up to 99.965% of visible light measured perpendicular to the material. The coatings are unique in that they are super-black and retain uniform light absorption from almost all viewing angles. Original CVD Vantablack is no longer manufactured for commercial applications as it has been superseded by Vantablack spray coatings that offer similar optical performance in key parts of the electromagnetic spectrum.

== History ==
Ben Jensen, founder and CTO of Surrey NanoSystems, invented the coatings, which were publicly unveiled in July 2014, and eventually commercialized by the scientific team from Surrey NanoSystems.

Early development occurred at the National Physical Laboratory in the UK; the term "Vanta" was coined later in its development. As a light-absorbing chemical, the name "VANTABLACK" is trademarked by Surrey NanoSystems Limited, and is referenced in three patents registered in the United States Patent and Trademark Office.

Surrey NanoSystems coats customer parts at its site in the UK; it also supplies a paint for commercial application. Several other firms also distribute vertically aligned nanotube arrays, including NanoLab and Santa Barbara Infrared.

=== Commercial production ===
The first orders were delivered in July 2014. In 2015, production was scaled up to meet demand in the aerospace and defense sectors.

=== Exclusive rights granted Anish Kapoor ===
Surrey Nanosystems granted Anish Kapoor exclusive rights to use Vantablack in artistic applications. Many artists voiced opposition to his monopoly over the substance.

In response, Nanolab, a Waltham, Massachusetts-based carbon nanotube manufacturer, partnered with Boston artist Jason Chase to release a nanotube-based black paint called Singularity Black. During the first showing of the colour, Chase, alluding to Vantablack, stated that "its possibilities have been stunted by not being available to experiment with", and Singularity Black's release was important to create access.

== Visual characteristics ==
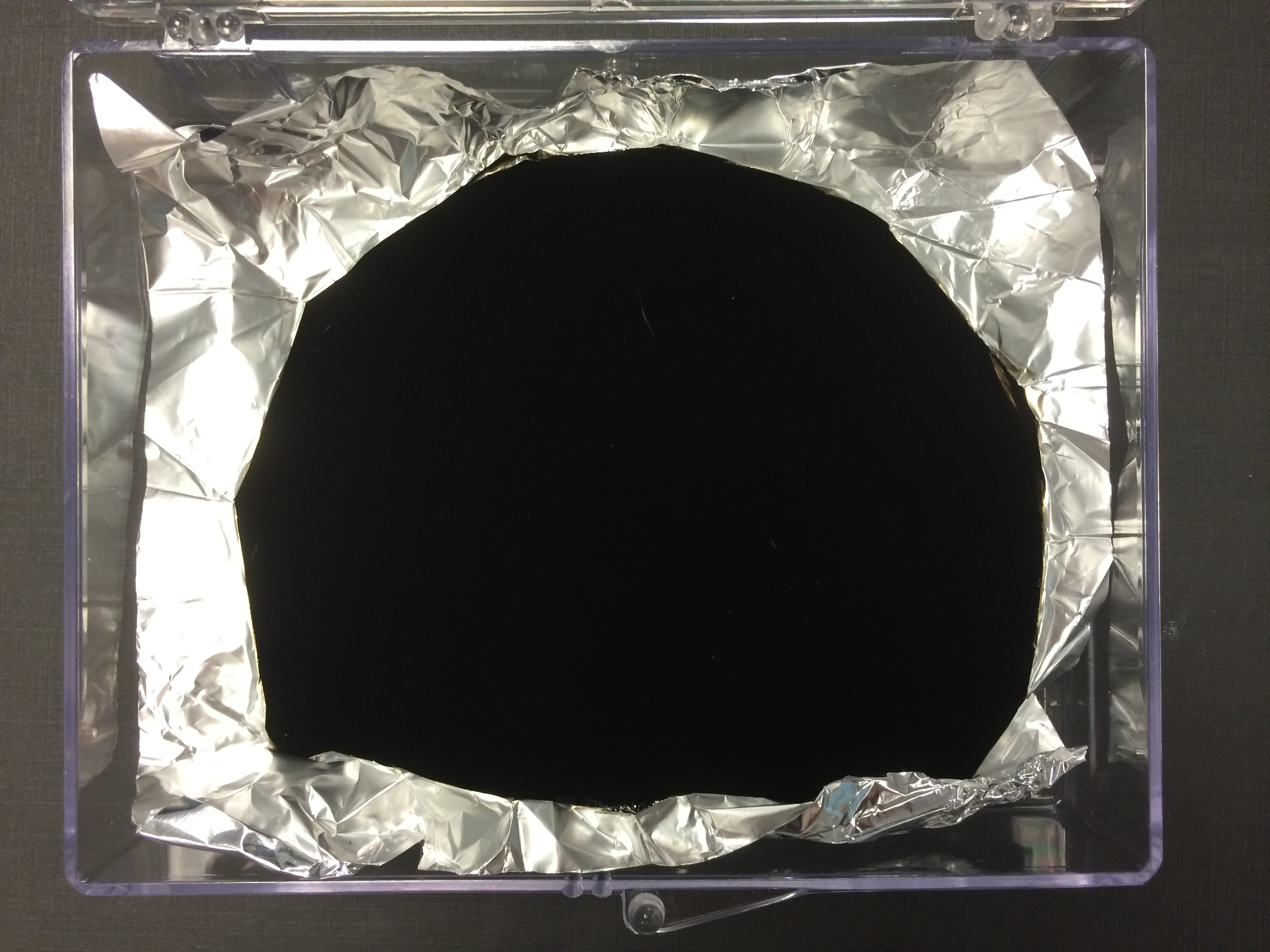
Wrinkled aluminium foil with a portion—equally wrinkled—coated in Vantablack

As Vantablack is composed of carbon nanotubes that absorb exceptionally high levels of visible light, it is one of the darkest pigments created. When applied to three-dimensional objects, Vantablack produces the appearance of a two-dimensional surface or void space.

== Properties ==
CVD Vantablack is composed of a forest of vertical carbon nanotubes "grown" on a substrate using a modified chemical vapor deposition process. When light strikes Vantablack, instead of bouncing off, it becomes trapped and continually deflected amongst the tubes, absorbed, and eventually dissipated as heat.

CVD Vantablack was an improvement over similar substances developed at the time. Vantablack absorbs up to 99.965% of visible light and can be created at 400 °C (752 °F). NASA had previously developed a similar substance that was grown at 750 °C (1,380 °F), which required materials to be more heat resistant than Vantablack. Darker materials are possible: in 2019, Massachusetts Institute of Technology engineers developed a CVD material which reflects a tenth of the amount of light that Vantablack reflects.

The outgassing and particle fallout levels of Vantablack are low compared to similar substances, which makes it more commercially viable. Vantablack is resistant to mechanical vibration and exhibits thermal stability.

== Applications ==
As one of the darkest materials, Vantablack has many potential applications, such as preventing stray light from entering telescopes, and improving the performance of infrared cameras both on Earth and in space. Surfaces coated with Vantablack are highly suitable for emitting and absorbing black body radiation. These coatings possess suitable durability, which enables them to perform well in diverse temperature ranges and environments such as vacuum and air applications. Consequently, using Vantablack coatings in optical configurations can enhance their overall performance. In addition to directly growing aligned carbon nanotubes, Vantablack is made into two sprayable paints with randomly oriented nanotubes, Vantablack S-VIS and Vantablack S-IR with better infrared absorption than the former. These paints require a special license, a temperature of 100–280 °C, and vacuum post-processing. Vantablack VBx is a non-nanotube sprayable paint that is simpler to apply.

University of Surrey is developing Vantablack as a coating for satellites in earth orbit, to reduce encroachment upon ground-based optical astronomy. The material is under consideration for use in cameras and sensors, cinema projectors and lenses. Its light-absorbing properties have the potential to improve the efficiency of solar panels and cells.

=== In art ===
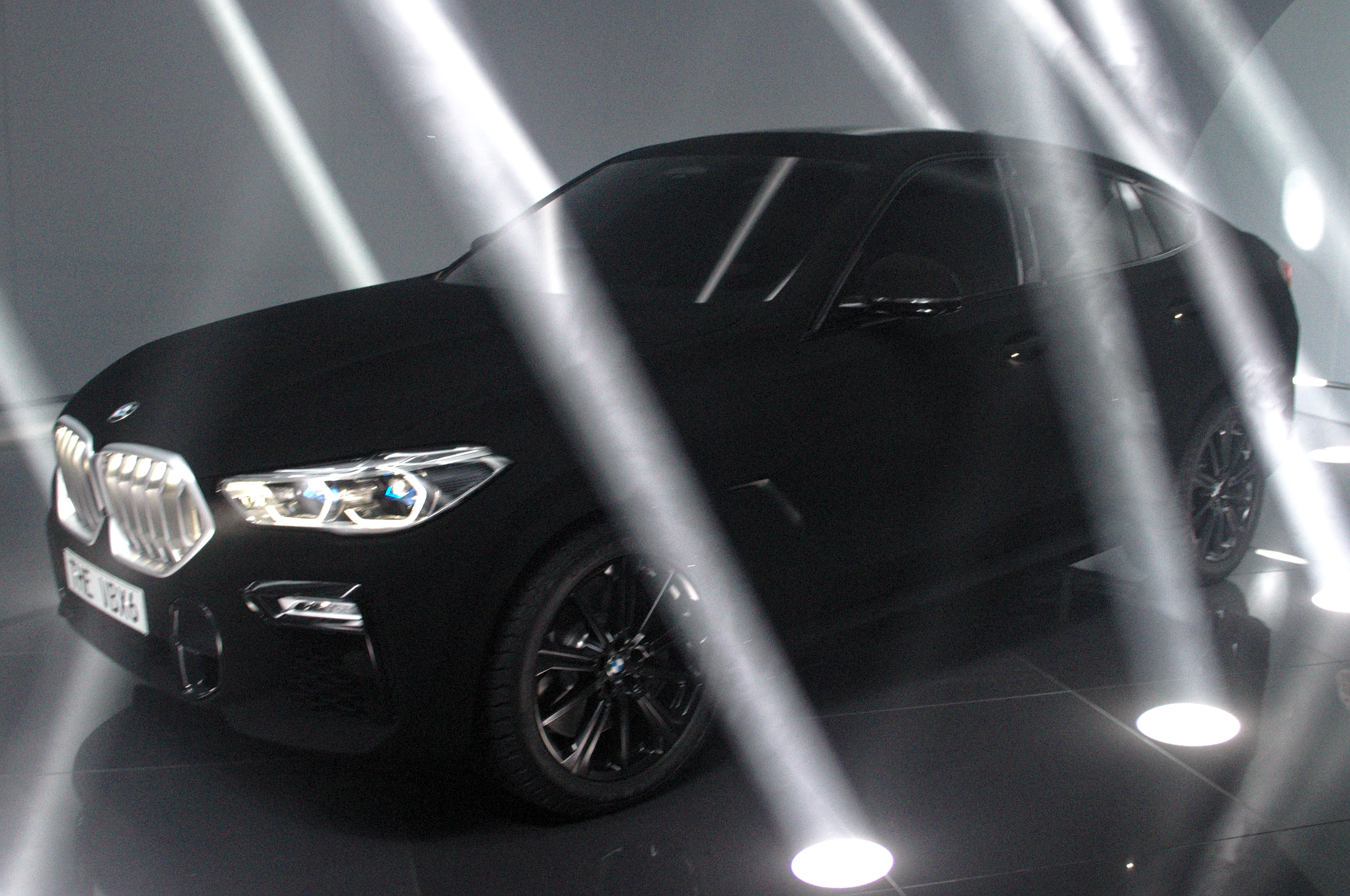
BMW X6 Vantablack at the International Motor Show Germany 2019

Vantablack S-VIS, a sprayable paint that uses randomly aligned carbon nanotubes and very high levels of absorption from ultraviolet to the terahertz spectrum, has been exclusively licensed to Anish Kapoor's studio for artistic use. An additional restriction is that Vantablack is subject to export controls by the UK. Due to its physical requirements and thermal characteristics, the original Vantablack is not practical for use in many types of art.

Vantablack VBx2, a variant of the non-nanotube Vantablack VBx that is optimized for large area spraying, was used in a "Vantablack pavilion" at the 2018 Winter Olympics.

In May 2018 at the Met Gala, Canadian musician Grimes as part of her outfit wore a crown that incorporated Vantablack, which she and her then-boyfriend Elon Musk had obtained a sample of from the manufacturer.

In October 2018, to promote the release of their first-person shooter video game Call of Duty: Black Ops 4, Activision partnered with Surrey NanoSystems to create the "Black Ops House", a small building in London painted entirely in Vantablack VBx2 where visitors could play the PlayStation 4 port of the game over the course of a two-day press event.

In September 2019, BMW unveiled an X6 concept with Vantablack paint at the International Motor Show Germany; however, the company does not plan on using it on production models of the X6.

French musician Gesaffelstein used Vantablack VBx2 as part of his stage decoration during his Coachella 2019 performance.

== See also ==
- Eigengrau – Illusionary dark gray color
- International Klein Blue – Deep blue pigment first mixed by the French artist Yves Klein
- Super black – Highly light-absorbent surface treatment
