= Ethylene propylene rubber =

Type of synthetic elastomer

Ethylene propylene rubber (EPR), (sometimes called Ethylene propylene monomer (EPM) referring to an ASTM standard) is a type of synthetic elastomer that is closely related to ethylene propylene diene monomer (EPDM rubber). Since introduction in the 1960s, annual production has increased to 870,000 metric tons.

The skeletal formula of ethylene propylene rubber.

EPR is used in electrical cable insulation, and in many flexible rubber goods such as hoses or weatherstripping.

== Properties ==
EPM is considered a valuable elastomer due to its useful chemical and physical properties; it is resistant to heat, oxidation, ozone and the weather (owing to its stable, saturated backbone) and it is also not susceptible to color loss. As a non-polar compound, EPM is an electrical insulator and it is insoluble in many polar solvents, both protic and aprotic. Amorphous forms of EPM are flexible at low temperatures (with glass transition points around -60 °C). Via selection of certain sulfur compounds EPM can remain heat resistant up to 130 °C and up to 160 °C with peroxide curing. These two tables contain some of the main properties of EPM.

=== Polymer properties ===
Property Type	EPM Property
Mooney viscosity at 125 °C	5-200
Ethylene content percentage by weight	45-80
Diene content percentage by weight	0-15
Specific gravity	0.855-0.880

Property type	EPM Property
Hardness (Shore A durometer)	30–95
Tensile strength (MPa)	7–21
Elongation	100–600%
Compression set B	20–60%
Useful temperature range (°C)	−50 to +160
Tear resistance	Fair to good
Abrasion resistance	Fair to good
Resilience	Fair to good
Electrical properties	Insulator

== Uses ==
EPM has a large number of uses due to the many ways in which the polymer can be designed, for example; it is used in automotive weather-stripping and seals, self-amalgamating tape, glass run channels, radiators, garden and appliance hoses, tubing, belts, roofing membranes, expansion joints, rubber mechanical goods, plastic impact modification, thermoplastic vulcanisates and motor oil additive applications. EPM is even more prevalent as an insulator for high-voltage cables (usually referred as HEPR - Hard grade Ethylene Propylene Rubber) since it has improved insulative characteristics over more traditional cables, such as cross-linked polyethylene, enabling a smaller cross sectional area for the same load carrying capacity. The cable is flexible and suited to applications where regular cable movement is required such as in the mining industry.

== Producers ==
Major producers and suppliers of EPM include Crompton Corporation, Exxon-Mobil, Dupont, Herdillia, Kumho Polychem, LANXESS, Mitsui Chemicals, ENI Versalis and Sumitomo Chemical.

== Manufacture ==
EPM manufacture uses the same monomers as polyethene and polypropene, the ethylene and propylene monomers are randomly combined to yield a rubbery, stable polymer. By varying the monomer ratios and method by which the monomers are combined different forms of EPM can be formed (with a wide range of Mooney viscosities); ranging from amorphous to semi-crystalline. A third, non-conjugated diene monomer can be terpolymerized in a controlled manner to maintain an unsaturated backbone ready for vulcanization or polymer modification.

== See also ==
Francis P. Baldwin received the 1979 Charles Goodyear Medal for the many patents he held for these developments.
