= Silicone rubber =

Elastomer composed of silicone

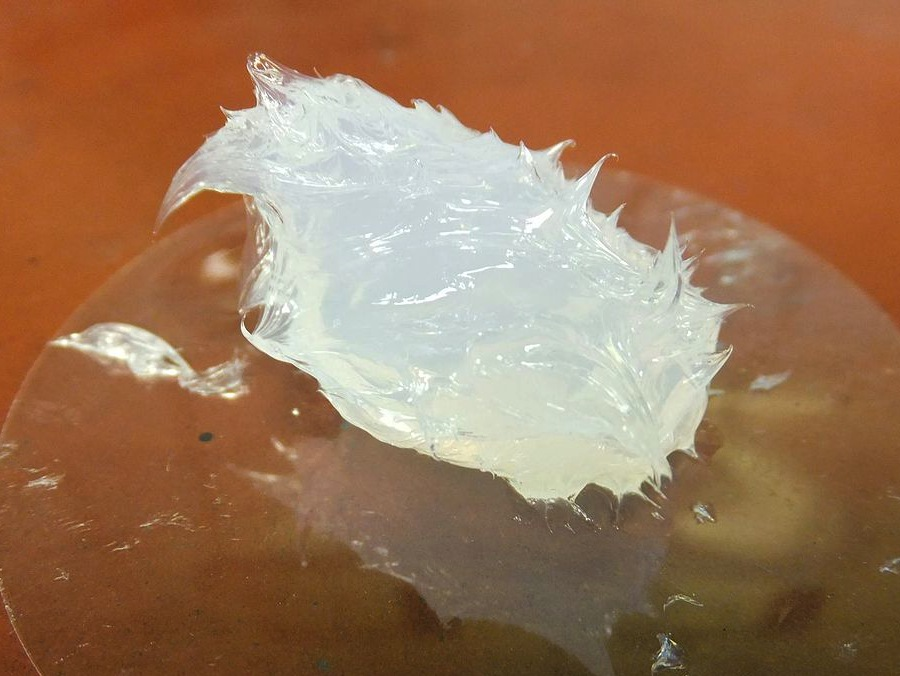
An uncured piece of liquid silicone rubber

Silicone rubber is an elastomer composed of silicone—itself a polymer—containing silicon together with carbon, hydrogen, and oxygen. Silicone rubbers are widely used in industry, and there are multiple formulations. Silicone rubbers are often one- or two-part polymers, and may contain fillers to improve properties or reduce cost. Silicone rubber is generally non-reactive, stable, and resistant to extreme environments and temperatures from −55 to 300 °C (−70 to 570 °F) while still maintaining its useful properties. Due to these properties and its ease of manufacturing and shaping, silicone rubber can be found in a wide variety of products, including voltage line insulators; automotive applications; cooking, baking, and food storage products; apparel such as undergarments, sportswear, and footwear; electronics; medical devices and implants; and in home repair and hardware, in products such as silicone sealants.

The term "silicone" is actually a misnomer. The suffix -one is used by chemists to denote a substance with a double-bonded atom of oxygen in its backbone. When first discovered, silicone was erroneously believed to have oxygen atoms bonded in this way. The technically correct term for the various silicone rubbers is polysiloxanes (polydimethylsiloxanes being a large subset), referring to a saturated Si-O backbone.

== Curing ==
In its uncured state, silicone rubber is a highly adhesive gel or liquid. To convert it to a solid, it must be cured, vulcanized, or catalyzed. This is normally carried out in a two-stage process at the point of manufacture into the desired shape, and then in a prolonged post-cure process. It can also be injection molded or 3D printed.

Silicone rubber may be cured by a platinum-catalyzed cure system, a condensation cure system, a peroxide cure system, or an oxime cure system. For the platinum-catalyzed cure system, the curing process can be accelerated by adding heat or pressure.

=== Platinum-based cure system ===
In a platinum-based silicone cure system, also called an addition system (because the key reaction-building polymer is an addition reaction), a hydride- and a vinyl-functional siloxane polymer react in the presence of a platinum complex catalyst, creating an ethyl bridge between the two. The reaction has no byproducts. Such silicone rubbers cure quickly, though the rate of or even ability to cure is easily inhibited in the presence of elemental tin, sulfur, and many amine compounds.

=== Condensation cure system ===
Condensation curing systems can be one-part or two-part systems. In one-part or RTV (room-temperature vulcanizing) system, a cross-linker exposed to ambient humidity (i.e., water) experiences a hydrolysis step and is left with a hydroxyl or silanol group. The silanol condenses further with another hydrolyzable group on the polymer or cross-linker and continues until the system is fully cured. Such a system will cure on its own at room temperature and (unlike the platinum-based addition cure system) is not easily inhibited by contact with other chemicals, though the process may be affected by contact with some plastics or metals and may not take place at all if placed in contact with already-cured silicone compounds. The crosslinkers used in condensation cure systems are typically alkoxy, acetoxy, ester, enoxy, or oxime silanes such as methyl trimethoxy silane for alkoxy-curing systems and methyl triacetoxysilane for acetoxy-curing systems. In many cases an additional condensation catalyst is added to fully cure the RTV system and achieve a tack-free surface. Organotitanate catalysts such as tetraalkoxy titanates or chelated titanates are used in alkoxy-cured systems. Tin catalysts such as dibutyl tin dilaurate (DBTDL) can be used in oxime and acetoxy-cured systems. Acetoxy tin condensation is one of the oldest cure chemistries used for curing silicone rubber, and is the one used in household bathroom caulk. Depending on the type of detached molecule, it is possible to classify silicone systems as acidic, neutral, or alkaline.

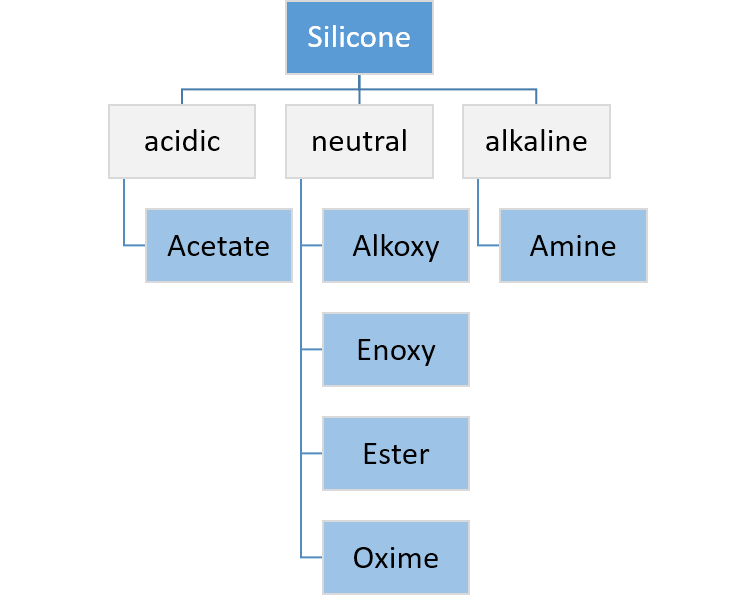
Overview of the most commonly used silicone systems

Two-part condensation systems package the cross-linker and condensation catalyst together in one part while the polymer and any fillers or pigments are in the second part. Mixing of the two parts causes the curing to take place. A typical filler is fumed silica, also known as pyrogenic silica, which used to control the flow properties of the sealant.

Once fully cured, condensation systems are effective as sealants and caulks in plumbing and building construction and as molds for casting polyurethane, epoxy, and polyester resins, waxes, gypsum, and low-melting-temperature metals such as lead. They are typically very flexible and have a high tear strength. They do not require the use of a release agent since silicones have non-stick properties.

=== Peroxide cure system ===
Peroxide curing is widely used for curing silicone rubber. The curing process leaves behind byproducts, which can be an issue in food contact and medical applications. However, these products are usually treated in a postcure oven which greatly reduces the peroxide breakdown product content. One of the two main organic peroxides used, dicumyl peroxide, has principal breakdown products of acetophenone and 2-phenyl-2-propanol. The other is 2,4-dichlorobenzoyl peroxide, whose principal breakdown products are 2,4-dichlorobenzoic acid and 1,3-dichlorobenzene.

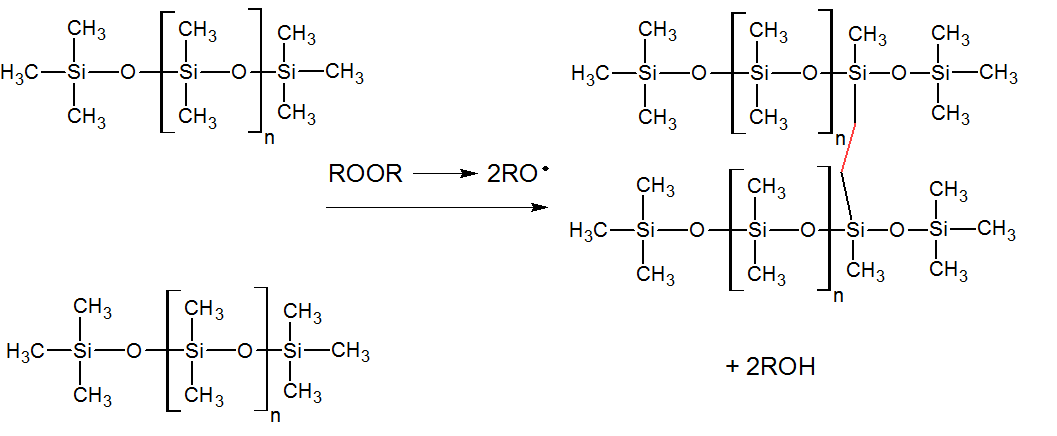
Crosslinking by organic peroxides

== History ==
The first silicone elastomers were developed in the search for better insulating materials for electric motors and generators. Resin-impregnated glass fibers were the state-of-the-art materials at the time. The glass was very heat resistant, but the phenolic resins would not withstand the higher temperatures that were being encountered in new smaller electric motors. Building on the work of Frederic Kipping, chemists at Corning Glass and General Electric were investigating heat-resistant materials for use as resinous binders when they synthesized the first silicone polymers, demonstrated that they worked well and found a route to produce them commercially.

Corning Glass in a joint venture with Dow Chemical formed Dow Corning in 1943 to produce this new class of materials. War-time uses included gaskets for the B29's superchargers and supporting searchlight lenses.

As the unique properties of the new silicone products were studied in more detail, their potential for broader usage was envisioned, and GE opened its own plant to produce silicones in 1947. GE Silicones was sold to Momentive Performance Materials in 2006. Wacker Chemie also started production of silicones in Europe in 1947. The Japanese company Shin-Etsu Chemical began mass production of silicone in 1953.

== Properties ==
Silicone rubber offers good resistance to extreme temperatures, operating normally from −100 to 300 °C (−150 to 570 °F). Silicone rubber has low tensile strength and poor wear-and-tear properties. Some properties such as elongation, creep, cyclic flexing, tear strength, compression set, dielectric strength (at high voltage), thermal conductivity, fire resistance, and, in some cases, tensile strength can be—at extreme temperatures—far superior to organic rubbers in general, although a few of these properties are still lower than for some specialty materials. Silicone rubber is a material of choice in industry when retention of initial shape and mechanical strength are desired under heavy thermal stress or sub-zero temperatures.

=== Compared to organic rubber ===
Organic rubber has a carbon-to-carbon backbone which can leave it susceptible to ozone, UV, heat, and other aging factors that silicone rubber can withstand well. This makes silicone rubber one of the elastomers of choice in many extreme environments. Silicone is considerably more permeable to gasses than most other rubbers which limits its use in some areas.

Silicone rubber is highly inert, does not react with most chemicals, and does not participate in biological processes, allowing it to be used in many medical applications including medical implants. It is biocompatible and hypoallergenic, which makes it suitable for baby care products, and food contact in general. Silicone rubber is a reliable solution (as opposed to rubber and thermoplastic elastomers) for migration or interaction problems between the main active ingredients. Its chemical stability prevents it from affecting any substrate it is in contact with (skin, water, blood, active ingredients, etc.).

Property	Value
Appearance	
Hardness, Shore A	25–90
Tensile failure stress, ultimate	1,400–10,300 kPa (200–1,500 psi)
Elongation after fracture in %	≥ 700% maximum
Density	Can be compounded from 0.95 to over 1.20 g/cm^{3}

=== Production ===
To make silicone, the silicon atoms must be isolated from the silicon dioxide compound silica. This is done by heating large volumes of quartz sand to extremely high temperatures, often up to 1800 °C. From here, there are several processes where silicon is combined with methyl chloride and heated. It is then distilled into a polymerised siloxane known as polydimethylsiloxane. The polydimethylsiloxane can then be polymerised. This is done using a variety of techniques depending on the use of the final product. The raw silicone compound is combined with any desired additives, which may include pigments, and the catalyst. It is then injection moulded, extruded, or 3D printed. Curing is the final stage in the production process.

=== Structure ===
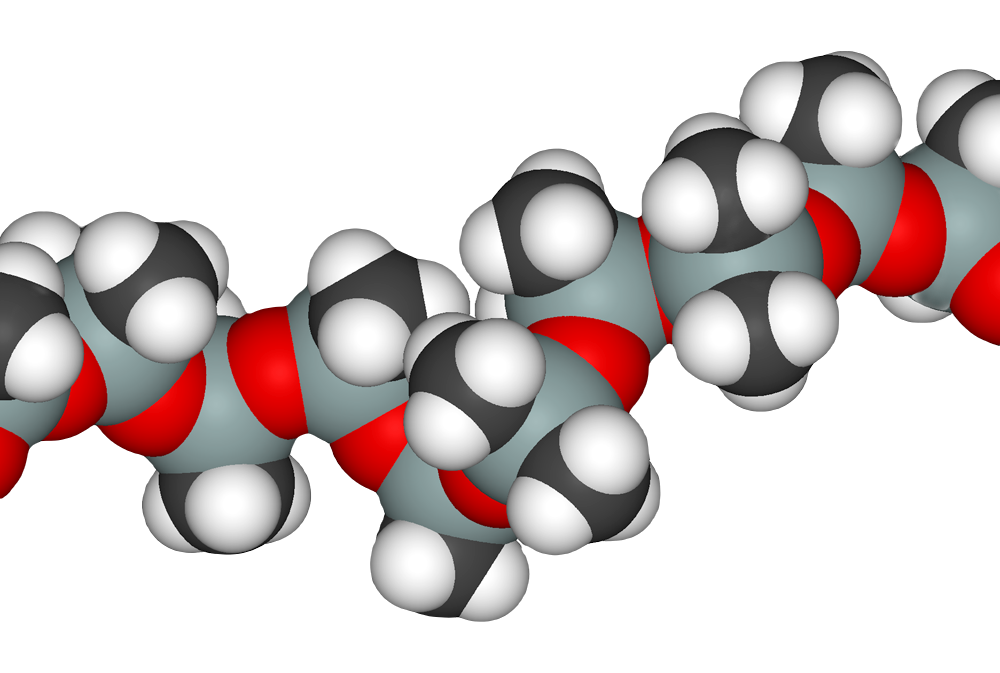
Silicone rubber chain

Repeat unit of silicone rubber

Polysiloxanes differ from other polymers in that their backbones consist of Si–O–Si units instead of C–C units. The large bond angles and bond lengths make polysiloxanes more flexible than basic polymers such as polyethylene. A C–C backbone unit has a bond length of 1.54 Å and a bond angle of 112°, whereas an Si–O backbone unit has a bond length of 1.63 Å and a bond angle of 130°. Polymer segments in polysiloxanes can move farther and change conformation easily, making for a flexible material. Polysiloxanes tend to be more stable and less chemically active because more energy is required to break the silicon–oxygen bond. Although silicon is a congener of carbon, having the same electron bonding configuration, silicon analogues of carbonaceous compounds generally exhibit different properties. The difference in total charge and mass between carbon with 6 protons and 6 neutrons, and silicon with 14 protons and 14 neutrons causes an added layer of electrons and their screening effect changes the electronegativity between the two elements. For example the silicon–oxygen bond in polysiloxanes is significantly more stable than the carbon-oxygen bond in polyoxymethylene, a structurally similar polymer. The difference is partly due to the higher bond energy, the energy required to break the Si-O bond, and also because polyoxymethylene decomposes formaldehyde, which is volatile and escapes driving decomposition forward, but Si-containing decomposition products of silicone are less volatile.

Mechanical properties (Polymax 2005)
Property	Value
Hardness, shore A	10–90
Tensile strength	11 N/mm^{2}
Elongation at break	100–1100 %
Maximum temperature	300 °C
Minimum temperature	−120 °C

== Special grades ==
There are many special grades and forms of silicone rubber, including: steam resistant, metal detectable, high tear strength, extreme high temperature, extreme low temperature, electrically conductive, chemical/oil/acid/gas resistant, low smoke emitting, optically clear, and flame-retardant. A variety of fillers can be used in silicone rubber, although most are non-reinforcing and lower the tensile strength.

Silicone rubber is available in a range of hardness levels, expressed as Shore A or IRHD between 10 and 100, the higher number being the harder compound. It is also available in virtually any colour, and can be colour matched.

== Applications ==
Silicone rubber is used in automotive applications, many cooking, baking, and food storage products, sex toys, apparel including undergarments, sportswear, and footwear, electronics, to home repair and hardware, and a host of unseen applications. It is usually processed and shaped with the following methods:

=== Extrusion ===
Once mixed and coloured, silicone rubber can be extruded into tubes, strips, solid cord, or custom profiles according to the size specifications of the manufacturer. Cord can be joined to make O-rings and extruded profiles can be joined to make seals.

=== Injection moulding ===
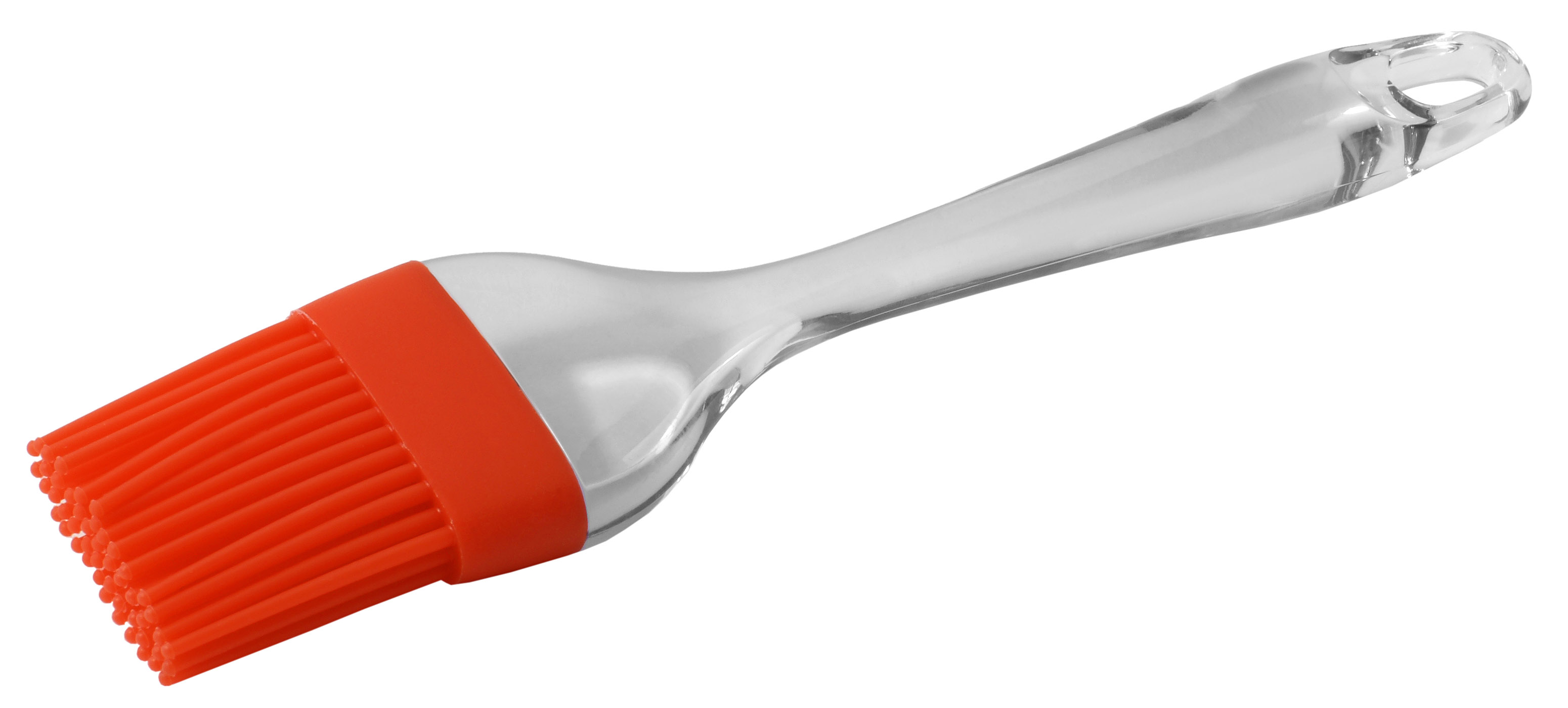
A silicone rubber pastry brush

Silicone rubber can be moulded into custom shapes and designs. Manufacturers work to set industry tolerances when extruding, cutting, or joining silicone rubber profiles. In the UK this is BS 3734, for extrusions the tightest level is E1 and the widest is E3.

=== 3D printing ===
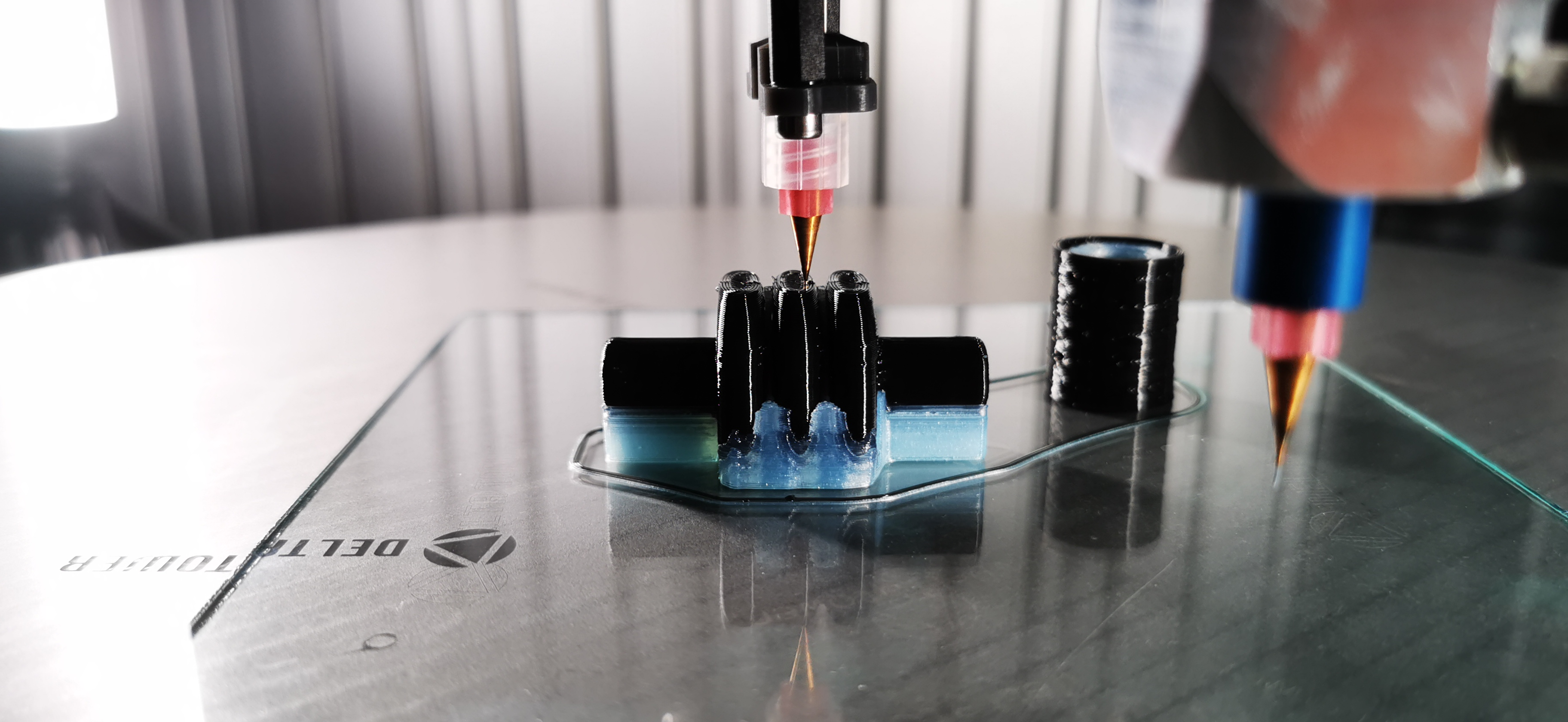
Silicone 3D print with support material

Silicone rubber can be 3D printed (liquid deposition modelling LDM) using pump-nozzle extrusion systems. Unfortunately, standard silicone formulations are optimized to be used by extrusion and injection moulding machines and are not applicable in LDM-based 3D printing. The rheological behavior and the pot life need to be adjusted.

3D printing also requires the use of a removable support material that is compatible with the silicone rubber.

Liquid silicone rubber is also manufactured for life science applications (syringe pistons, closure for dispensing system, gaskets for IV flow regulator, respiratory masks, and implantable chambers for IV administration), cosmetic products (mascara brush, make-up packaging, make-up applicator, and lipstick moulds), and optics products (circular lens, collimators, Fresnel lenses, and free-form lenses).

Freeze-tolerant solar water-heating panels exploit the elasticity of silicone to repeatedly accommodate the expansion of water on freezing, while its extreme temperature tolerance maintains a lack of brittleness below freezing and excellent tolerance of temperatures in excess of 150 °C (300 °F). Its property of not having a carbon backbone, but a chemically robust silicon backbone instead, reduces its potential as a food source for dangerous waterborne bacteria such as Legionella.

Non-dyed silicone rubber tape with an iron(III) oxide additive (making the tape a red-orange colour) is used extensively in aviation and aerospace wiring applications as a splice or wrapping tape due to its non-flammable nature. The iron oxide additive adds high thermal conductivity but does not change the high electrical insulation property of the silicone rubber. This type of self-amalgamating tape amalgamates or fuses to itself, so that when stretched and wrapped around cables, electrical joints, hoses, and pipes it bonds into a strong seamless rubbery electrically insulating and waterproof layer, although not adhesive. As an electrical insulator, silicone rubber has the added virtue of remaining non-conductive when damaged by heat, reducing the likelihood of runaway arcing.

With the addition of carbon or another conductive substance as a powdered filler, silicone rubber can be made electrically conductive while retaining most of its other mechanical properties. As such it is used for flexible contacts which close on being pressed, used in many devices such as computer keyboards and remote control handsets.

=== Electrical insulation ===
Silicone rubber is used as an electrical insulator in power cables and cable joints. Silicone-insulated cables are advantageous in that they can withstand temperatures from −90 to 200 °C (−130 to 390 °F), and are highly flexible. These properties make them suitable for maintaining circuit integrity in the event of a fire.

== Self-healing ==
In 2007, silicone rubber formed the matrix of the first autonomic self-healing elastomer. The microcapsule-based material was capable of recovering almost all of the original tear strength. Additionally, this material had improved fatigue properties as evaluated using a torsion-fatigue test.

== See also ==
- Forensic engineering
- Forensic polymer engineering
- Injection molding of liquid silicone rubber
- Medical grade silicone
- RTV silicone
