= Self-amalgamating tape =

Silicone rubber electrical tape

Self-amalgamating tape is a non-tacky silicone rubber tape that when stretched and wrapped around cables, electrical joints, hoses, and pipes combines or unites itself into a strong, seamless, rubbery, waterproof, and electrically insulating layer. Unlike many other polymers and fibers, it is heat-, sunlight-, and weather-resistant. This type of tape is also described, particularly in the United States, as "self-fusing", or "self-vulcanizing". In the US Air Force (and elsewhere) it is called centerline tape due to a colored line running down the center of some varieties, used to assist with even wrapping. It is sold under a variety of brand names, including "F4 tape", "Tommy Tape", "Rescue Tape", and "Fix-It Tape". Certified versions of this tape for aviation, marine, and military use meet A-A-59163 (was MIL-I-46852) and MIL-I-22444 specifications.

== Description ==
While not adhesive to the repaired object, it is cohesive, sticking to itself and securing the bond well. It is supplied in rolls with an interleaving layer, to prevent the tape from amalgamating before use. It may optionally be made with an iron-oxide additive which adds high thermal conductivity. This tape is used extensively in aviation and aerospace wiring applications as a splice or wrapping tape due to its non-flammability. It can be used for emergency repair of leaking low-pressure hoses and pipes.

Compared to most other electrical and utility tapes, centerline tape is not particularly tough mechanically. Silicone rubber feels soft and is also susceptible to cuts and abrasion, having low tear resistance. This weakness is made worse because this tape is wrapped while stretched, and remains under internal tension even while fused, so that any nicks or cuts may start to tear and expand without additional external tension. However, these same properties, combined with the lack of traditional gum adhesive, make tape removal, if needed, quick, clean, and easy.

Another form of self-amalgamating tape is made from ethylene propylene rubber (EPR) and has similar uses as silicone self-amalgamating tape but is non-vulcanising and has good moisture resistance. It is primarily used for insulating moisture sealing joints, splices and connections in electrical cables up to high voltages. A similar tape, PIB (polyisobutylene) rubber self-amalgamating tape, is used for more general purpose electrical lower voltage sealing and insulating cable applications.
