= ISO 6943 =

ISO standard

ISO 6943 is a specification created by the International Organization for Standardization for a method in determining the tension fatigue of vulcanised rubber.
