= Injection molding of liquid silicone rubber =

Process to produce pliable, durable parts in high volume

Injection molding of liquid silicone rubber (LSR) is a process to produce pliable, durable parts in high volume.

Liquid silicone rubber is a high purity platinum cured silicone with low compression set, good stability and ability to resist extreme temperatures of heat and cold ideally suitable for production of parts, where high quality is required. Due to the thermosetting nature of the material, liquid silicone injection molding requires special treatment, such as intensive distributive mixing, while maintaining the material at a low temperature before it is pushed into the heated cavity and vulcanized.

Chemically, silicone rubber is a family of thermoset elastomers that have a backbone of alternating silicon and oxygen atoms and methyl or vinyl side groups. Silicone rubbers constitute about 30% of the silicone family, making them the largest group of that family. Silicone rubbers maintain their mechanical properties over a wide range of temperatures and the presence of methyl-groups in silicone rubbers makes these materials extremely hydrophobic, making them suitable for electrical surface insulations.

Typical applications for liquid silicone rubber are products that require high precision such as seals, sealing membranes, electric connectors, multi-pin connectors, infant products where smooth surfaces are desired, such as bottle nipples, medical applications as well as kitchen goods such as baking pans, spatulas, etc. Often, silicone rubber is overmolded onto other parts made of different plastics. For example, a silicone button face might be overmolded onto a Nylon 6,6 housing.

== Equipment ==
In order for the liquid injection molding process to fully occur, several mechanical components must be in place. Typically, a molding machine requires a metered pumping device in conjunction with an injection unit—a dynamic or static mixer is attached. An integrated system can aid in precision and process efficiency. The critical components of a liquid injection molding machine include:

Injectors. An injecting device is responsible for pressurizing the liquid silicone to aid in the injection of the material into the pumping section of the machine. Pressure and injection rate can be adjusted at the operator's discretion.

Metering Units. Metering units pump the two primary liquid materials, the catalyst and the base forming silicone, ensuring that the two materials maintain a constant ratio while being simultaneously released.

Supply Drums. Supply drums, also called plungers, serve as the primary containers for mixing materials. Both the supply drums and a container of pigment connect to the main pumping system.

Mixers. A static or dynamic mixer combines materials after they exit the metering units. Once combined, pressure is used to drive the mixture into a designated mold.

Nozzle. To facilitate the deposition of the mixture into the mold, a nozzle is used. Often, the nozzle features an automatic shut-off valve to help prevent leaking and overfilling the mold.

Mold Clamp. A mold clamp secures the mold during the injection molding process, and opens the mold upon completion.

== Characteristics of LSR ==
Biocompatibility: Under extensive testing, liquid silicone rubber has demonstrated superior compatibility with human tissue and body fluids. In comparison to other elastomers, LSR is resistant to bacteria growth and will not stain or corrode other materials. LSR is also tasteless and odorless and can be formulated to comply with stringent FDA requirements. The material can be sterilized via a variety of methods, including steam autoclaving, ethylene oxide (ETO), gamma, e-beam and numerous other techniques, meeting all required approvals such as BfR XV, FDA 21 CFR 177.2600, USP Class VI.

Durable: LSR parts can withstand extreme temperatures, which makes them an ideal choice for components under the hood of cars and in close proximity to engines. Parts fabricated via liquid silicone rubber injection molding are fire retardant and will not melt.

Chemical resistance: Liquid silicone rubber resists water, oxidation and some chemical solutions such as acids and alkali.

Temperature resistance: Compared to other elastomers, silicone can withstand a wide range of high/low temperature extremes.

Mechanical properties: LSR has good elongation, high tear and tensile strength, excellent flexibility and a hardness range of 5 to 80 Shore A.

Electrical properties: LSR has excellent insulating properties, which offer an appealing option for a host of electrical applications. Compared to conventional insulating material, silicone can perform in far higher and lower temperatures.

Transparency and pigmentation: LSR possesses a natural transparency. This attribute makes it possible to produce colorful, custom, molded products

== Injection molding process ==
Liquid silicone rubbers are supplied in barrels. Because of their low viscosity, these rubbers can be pumped through pipelines and tubes to the vulcanization equipment. The two components are pumped through a static mixer by a metering pump. One of the components contains the catalyst, typically platinum based. A coloring paste as well as other additives can also be added before the material enters the static mixer section. In the static mixer the components are well mixed and are transferred to the cooled metering section of the injection molding machine. The static mixer renders a very homogeneous material that results in products that are not only very consistent throughout the part, but also from part to part. This is in contrast to solid silicone rubber materials that are purchased pre-mixed and partially vulcanized. In contrast, hard silicone rubbers are processed by transfer molding and result in less material consistency and control, leading to higher part variability. Additionally, solid silicone rubber materials are processed at higher temperatures and require longer vulcanization times.

Liquid silicone has a very low viscosity index and requires perfect seals of the mould cavity in order to guarantee a burr-free finished product. As injections are carried out at high temperature, steel dilation and natural shrinkage of materials must be considered at the design stage of the LSR injection tooling.

From the metering section of the injection molding machine, the compound is pushed through cooled sprue and runner systems into a heated cavity where the vulcanization takes place. The cold runner and general cooling results in no loss of material in the feed lines. The cooling allows production of LSR parts with nearly zero material waste, eliminating trimming operations and yielding significant savings in material cost.

Liquid silicone rubbers are supplied in a variety of containers, from tubes to 55 gallon drums. Because of their viscous nature, these liquids are pumped at high pressures (500 - 5000 psi) based on the durometer of the material. The raw materials are shipped in two separate containers (known in the industry as a kit) identified as "A" and B" compounds, with the "B" side usually containing the catalyst, but may vary based on the brand of silicone used. The two (A and B) compounds must be mixed in a 1 to 1 ratio, usually by way of a static mixer, adding pigment during the mixing process before the curing process begins. Once the two components come together the curing process begins immediately. A chiller supplying cold water to jacketed fittings is typically used to retard the curing process prior to the materials introduction to the mold. A color pigment can be added via a color injector used in conjunction with the material pump (closed loop metering system) before the material enters the static mixer section.

In a cold deck scenario, the 1 to 1 mixed compound is pumped through cooled sprue and runner systems into a heated cavity where the vulcanization takes place. The cold runner and general cooling results in minimal loss of material as the injection occurs directly into the part or cavity, saving on overall material costs and using high consistency rubber. The cooling allows production of LSR parts with nearly zero material valve gate waste, however this does not guarantee a "flash free" finished part. Molds and tooling are varying in design, execution and cost. A good cold runner is expensive as compared to conventional hot runner tooling, and has the potential to provide a high level of performance.

== Advantages of liquid silicone injection molding ==
- Batches stability (ready-to-use material)
- Process repeatability
- Direct injection (no waste)
- Short cycle time
- ‘Flashless’ technology (no burrs)
- Automated process
- Automated demolding systems
