= Llewellyn separator =

Membrane molecular separator

The Llewellyn separator is a membrane molecular separator, a device for interfacing the effluence from a gas chromatograph to the ion source input of a mass spectrometer by changing a rather large (e.g. 10^4 TorrLitre) dilute (e.g. 1 part of vapour in 10^5 parts of carrier gas) gas flow into a small(e.g. <10^-3 TorrLitre) concentrated flow that can be admitted to the vacuum of the mass spectrometer. It is typically based on the substance passing through a few silicone rubber membranes in series. In order for the molecules of interest to be enriched in relation to the small and light carrier gas molecules the former must be captured by (dissolved in) the membrane polymer. The selection properties may be augmented by a liquid stationary phase on the membrane.
