= Albert Ferdinand Shore =

American metallurgist (1876–1936)

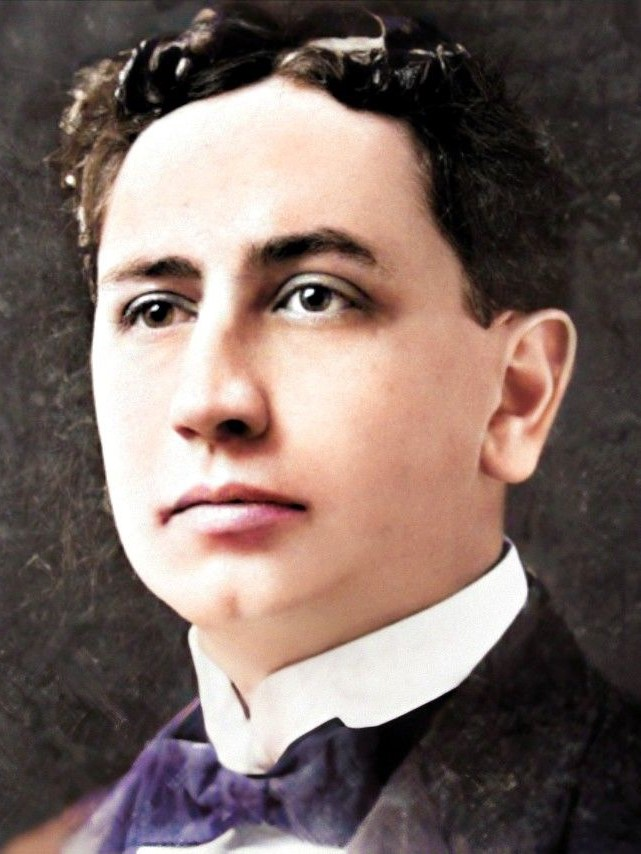
Albert Ferdinand Shore (1876–1936)

Albert Ferdinand Shore (September 4, 1876 – January 17, 1936) was an American metallurgist and the inventor of the Shore durometer. He won the Elliott Cresson Medal.

Shore was born in New York City on September 4, 1876. He invented the first quadrant durometer in 1915 to measure the hardness of polymers and other elastomers.

Shore died at Wickersham Hospital in Manhattan of a stroke. He was buried in Trinity Roman Catholic Cemetery in North Amityville, New York.
