= RTV silicone =

Type of silicone rubber

RTV silicone (room-temperature-vulcanizing silicone) is a type of silicone rubber that cures at room temperature. It is available as a one-component product, or mixed from two components (a base and curative). Manufacturers provide it in a range of hardnesses from very soft to medium—usually from 15 to 40 Shore A. RTV silicones can be cured with a catalyst consisting of either platinum or a tin compound such as dibutyltin dilaurate. Applications include low-temperature over-molding, making molds for reproducing, and lens applications for some optically clear grades. It is also used widely in the automotive industry as an adhesive and sealant, for example to create gaskets in place.

== Chemistry ==
RTV silicones are made from a mixture of silicone polymers, fillers, and organoreactive silane catalysts. Silicones are formed from a Si–O bond, but can have a wide variety of side chains. The silicone polymers are often made by reacting dimethyl dichlorosilane with water.

Linear dimethylpolysiloxane polymer reaction

Fillers such as acetic acid can provide a fast cure time, while oxides and nitrides can provide better thermal conductivity. Tack-free times are typically on the order of minutes, with cure times on the order of hours.

=== One-component silicone ===
One-part silicones make use of moisture in the atmosphere to cure from the outside towards the center. The time to cure will decrease with an increase in temperature, humidity and surface-area-to-volume ratio.

=== Two-component silicone ===
Two-part silicones use moisture in the second component as well as a cross-linker such as active alkoxy to cure the silicone in a process called condensation curing. Two-part silicones can also be platinum catalyzed in a "addition" reaction. Other reactive species to facilitate cross-linking include acetoxy, amine, octoate, and ketoxime.

== Applications ==
To produce the material, a user mixes silicone rubber with the curing agent or vulcanizing agent. Usually, the mixing ratio is a few percent. For RTV silicone to reproduce surface textures, the original must be clean. Vacuum de-airing removes entrained air bubbles from the mixed silicone and catalyst to ensure optimal tensile strength, which affects reproduction times. In casting and mold-making, RTV silicone rubber reproduces fine details and is suitable for a variety of industrial and art-related applications including prototypes, furniture, sculpture, and architectural elements. RTV silicone rubber can be used to cast materials including wax, gypsum, low-melt alloys/metals, and urethane, epoxy, or polyester resins (without using a release agent). A more recent innovation is the ability to 3D print RTV silicones. RTV silicones' industrial applications include aviation, aerospace, consumer electronics, and microelectronics. Some aviation and aerospace product applications are cockpit instruments, engine electronics potting, and engine gasketing. RTV silicones are used for their ability to withstand mechanical and thermal stress.

== Features ==
1. Good characteristics of easy operation
2. Light viscosity and good flow-ability
3. Low shrinkage
4. Favorable tension
5. No deformation
6. Favorable hardness
7. High-temperature resistance, acid and alkali resistance, and ageing resistance

== Advantages and disadvantages ==
RTV silicone rubber has excellent release properties compared to mold rubbers, which is especially an advantage when doing production casting of resins (polyurethane, polyester, and epoxy). No release agent is required, obviating post-production cleanup. Silicones also exhibit good chemical resistance and high-temperature resistance (205 °C, 400 °F and higher). For this reason, silicone molds are suitable for casting low-melt metals and alloys (e.g. zinc, tin, pewter, and Wood's metal).

RTV silicone rubbers are, however, generally expensive – especially platinum-cure. They are also sensitive to substances (sulfur-containing modelling clay such as Plastilina, for example) that may prevent the silicone from curing (referred to as cure inhibition). Silicones are usually very thick (high viscosity), and must be vacuum degassed prior to pouring, to minimize bubble entrapment. If making a brush-on rubber mold, the curing time factor between coats is long (longer than urethanes or polysulfides, shorter than latex). Silicone components (A+B) must be mixed accurately by weight (scale required) or else they do not work. Tin-catalyst silicone shrinks somewhat and does not have a long shelf life.

Acetoxysilane-based RTV releases acetic acid during the curing process. The locally released acetic acid can attack solder joints, detaching solder from copper wire. The locally released acetic acid can discolor the plating on mirror backs years after installation, making this type of RTV unsuitable for use as a mirror adhesive.
