= ISO 2921 =

ISO standard for vulcanised rubber

ISO 2921 is a specification created by the International Organization for Standardization for a method in determining the temperature-retraction characteristics of stretched vulcanized rubber. Since many thermoplastic elastomers have a yield point at 5% to 20% elongation, the standard does not cover them.

It is based on the principle of applying a tension force to the sample of rubber, then cooling the rubber until it no longer retracts by itself. Then, warming the rubber and recording at what temperature the rubber shrinks back to specific sizes. The rubber is placed in a fluid bath, though gasses may also be used if it doesn't change the result of the experiment.
