= Bloom (test) =

Test to measure strength of a gel

Bloom is a test used to measure the strength of a gel, most commonly gelatin. The test was originally developed and patented in 1925 by Oscar T. Bloom. The test determines the weight in grams needed by a specified plunger (normally with a diameter of 0.5 inch) to depress the surface of the gel by 4 mm without breaking it at a specified temperature. The number of grams is called the Bloom value, and most gelatins are between 30 and 300 g Bloom. The higher a Bloom value, the higher the melting and gelling points of a gel, and the shorter its gelling times. This method is most often used on soft gelatin capsules ("softgels"). To perform the Bloom test on gelatin, a lab keeps a 6.67% gelatin solution for 17–18 hours at 10 °C prior to testing it.

Various gelatins are categorized as "low Bloom", "medium Bloom", or "high Bloom", but there are not universally defined specific values for these subranges. Gelatin is a biopolymer material composed of polypeptide chains of varying length. The longer the chain, the higher the Bloom number:

Gelatin classes
Category	Bloom number (Bloom strength)	Average molecular mass	Examples
Low Bloom	30–150	20,000–25,000	Beef hide low Bloom gelatin (USP-NF)
Medium Bloom	150–225	40,000–50,000	Gelatin type B
High Bloom	225–325	50,000–100,000	Gelatin type A

== See also ==
- Durometer
