= Tearing (physics) =

Breaking material apart with force

A torn sheet of paper

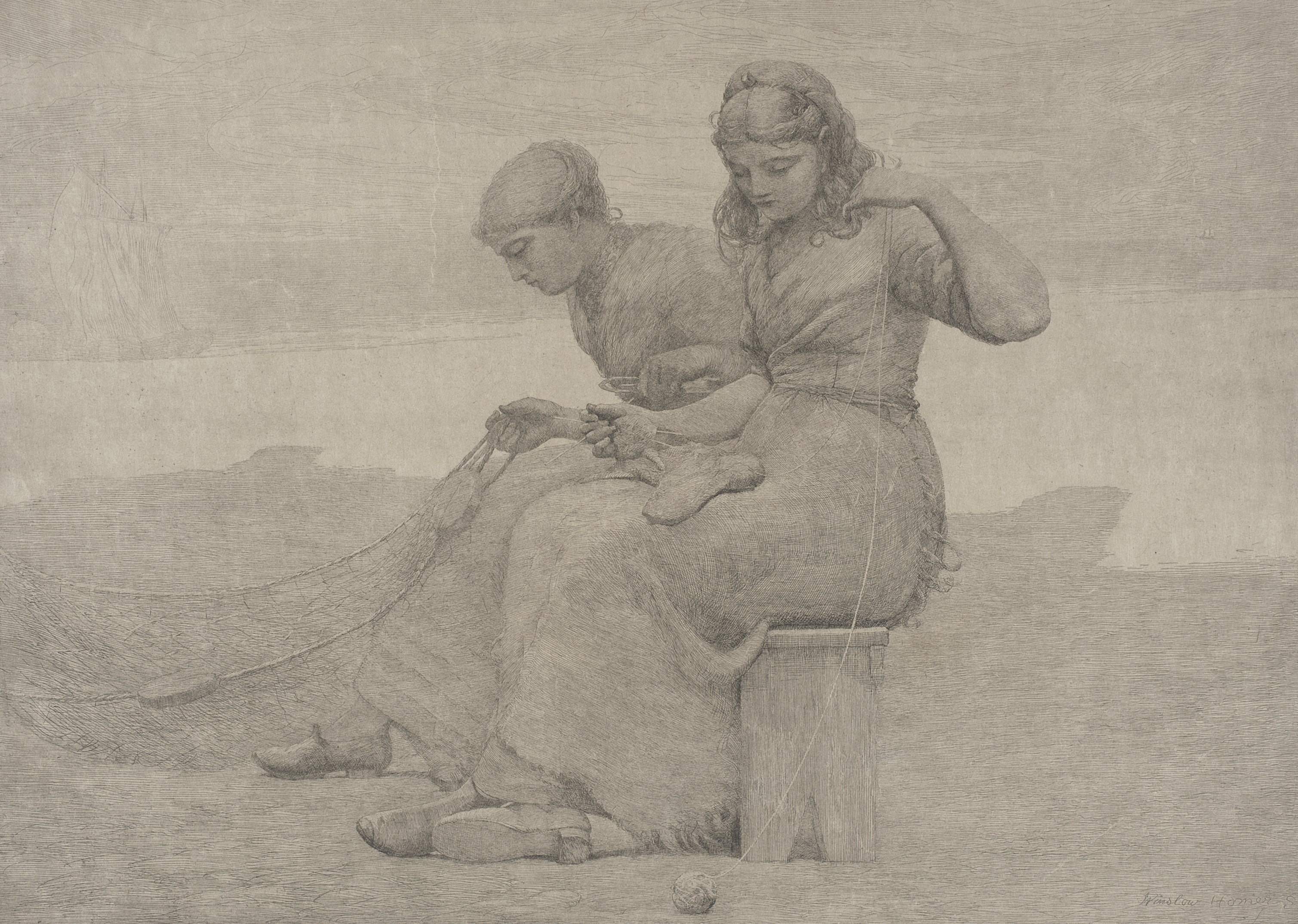
Mending the Tears, print by Winslow Homer (1888), Los Angeles County Museum of Art

Tearing is the act of breaking apart a material by force, without the aid of a cutting tool. A tear in a piece of paper, fabric, or some other similar object may be the result of the intentional effort with one's bare hands, or be accidental. Unlike a cut, which is generally on a straight or patterned line controlled by a tool such as scissors, a tear is generally uneven and, for the most part, unplanned. An exception is a tear along a perforated line, as found on a roll of toilet paper or paper towels, which has been previously partially cut, so the effort of tearing will probably produce a straight line.

Materials vary in their susceptibility to tearing. Some materials may be quite resistant to tearing when they are in their full form, but when a small cut or tear is made, the material becomes compromised, and the effort needed to continue tearing along that line becomes less.

Materials can be characterized by standard test methods to measure their tear resistance. There are several applicable standards which vary around the world. The variables which affect tear strength are defined "the shape of the test piece, speed of stretching and temperature."

== See also ==
- Cutting
- Deformation
- Ripstop
- Screen tearing
