= LI-900 =

Reusable surface insulation tile

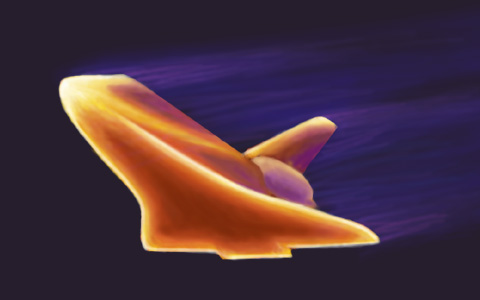
Simulation of the outside of the Shuttle as it heats up to over 1,500 °C during re-entry

LI-900 is a type of reusable surface insulation tile developed and manufactured by Lockheed Missiles and Space Company. It was designed for use on the Space Shuttle orbiter as part of its thermal protection system to minimize thermal conductivity while providing maximum thermal shock resistance.

== Statistics ==
LI-900 has a bulk density of 144.2 kg/m^{3}, or 9 lb/ft^{3}. Due to this material’s density being 9 lb/ft^{3} it was called the LI-900. It is made from 99.9% pure silica glass fibres, and is 94% air by volume. An LI-900 tile can be heated to 1,204 °C (1,477 K; 2,199 °F) and then immediately plunged into cold water and suffer no damage.

Black and white tiles were used on the Space Shuttle to control the temperature of the vehicle while in orbit.

- White tiles (known as low temperature reusable surface insulation or LRSI) were used mainly on the upper surface and have higher thermal reflectivity. These are therefore pointed towards the sun in order to minimize solar gain.
- Black tiles (known as high temperature reusable surface insulation or HRSI) are optimized for maximum emissivity, which means they lose heat faster than white tiles. This property is required in order to maximise heat rejection during re-entry.

There are typically 20,000 HRSI LI-900 tiles on a Space Shuttle, and 725 LRSI LI-900 tiles.

== Problems ==
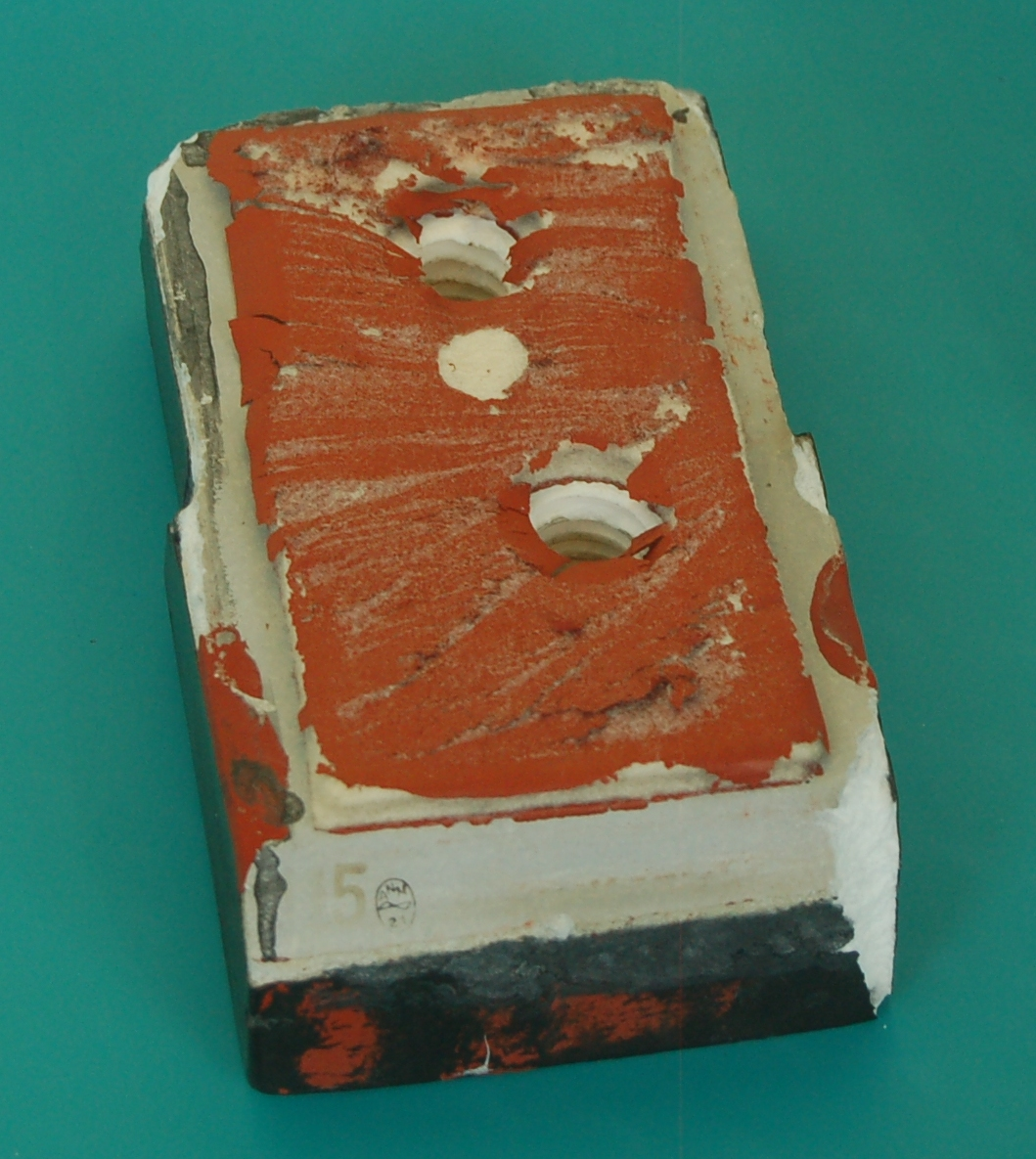
A used tile from Atlantis

=== Strength ===
As a result of optimizing its thermal properties, overall strength was reduced. The tile was therefore not suitable to be used in high-stress areas such as around the landing gear doors and windows. To solve this, a higher strength version of the LI-900 material was produced, with a bulk density of 352.4 kg/m^{3} (22 lb/ft^{3}), which was called the LI-2200. This tile provided the strength and insulating properties, but with a considerable weight penalty.

== See also ==
- Space Shuttle thermal protection system
- Atmospheric reentry

== Sources ==
- NASA facts on the Orbiter Thermal Protection System
- Research and technology report on shuttle materials resistant to MMOD
