= Compression set =

Permanent deformation of a material after removal of compressive stress

The compression set (ASTM D395) of a material is the permanent deformation remaining after compressing it. In specific methods, temperatures and percent compression are specified. The term is normally applied to soft materials such as elastomers and foams. Compression is normally measured in two ways: compression set A and compression set B.

== Compression Set A ==
A diagram of the compression set A experiment (under constant force in air).

This has the formal name compression set under constant force in air. In compression set A a force of 1.8 kN is applied to the specimen for a set time at a set temperature. Compression set A is defined as the percentage of original specimen thickness after the specimen has been left in normal (uncompressed) conditions for 30 minutes. C_{A}, the compression set A is given by C_{A} = [(t_{o} - t_{i}) / t_{o}] * 100 where t_{o} is the original specimen thickness and t_{i} is the specimen thickness after testing.

== Compression Set B ==
A diagram of the compression set B experiment (under constant deflection in air).

This has the formal name compression set under constant deflection in air. The specimen is compressed to 75% of its original height for a set time and at a set temperature (sample is compressed to .75 of its original height). Compression set B is (like Compression set A) defined as the percentage of specimen deflection after it has been left in normal (uncompressed) conditions for 30 minutes. C_{B}, the compression set B is given by C_{B} = [(t_{o} - t_{i}) / (t_{o} - t_{n})] * 100 where t_{o} is the original specimen thickness, t_{i} is the specimen thickness after testing and t_{n} is the spacer thickness or the specimen thickness during the test.
