= Vulcanization =

Process of hardening rubber

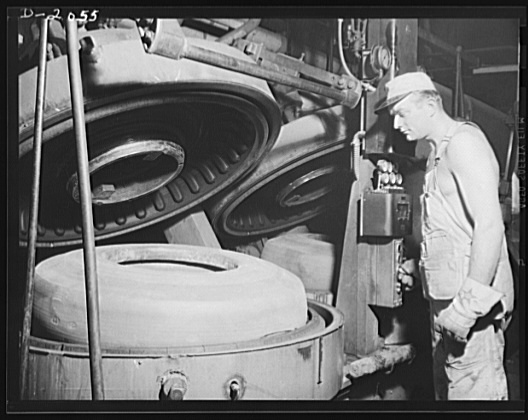
Worker placing a tire in a mold before vulcanization, 1941

Vulcanization (British English: vulcanisation) is a range of processes for hardening rubbers. The term originally referred exclusively to the treatment of natural rubber with sulfur and heat, which remains the most common practice. It has also grown to include the hardening of other (synthetic) rubbers via various means. Examples include silicone rubber via room temperature vulcanising and chloroprene rubber (neoprene) using metal oxides.

Vulcanization can be defined as the curing of elastomers, with the terms 'vulcanization' and 'curing' sometimes used interchangeably in this context. It works by forming cross-links between sections of the polymer chain which results in increased rigidity and durability, as well as other changes in the mechanical and electrical properties of the material. Vulcanization, in common with the curing of other thermosetting polymers, is generally irreversible.

The word was suggested by William Brockedon (a friend of Thomas Hancock who attained the British patent for the process) based on the god Vulcan who was associated with heat and sulfur in volcanoes.

== History ==
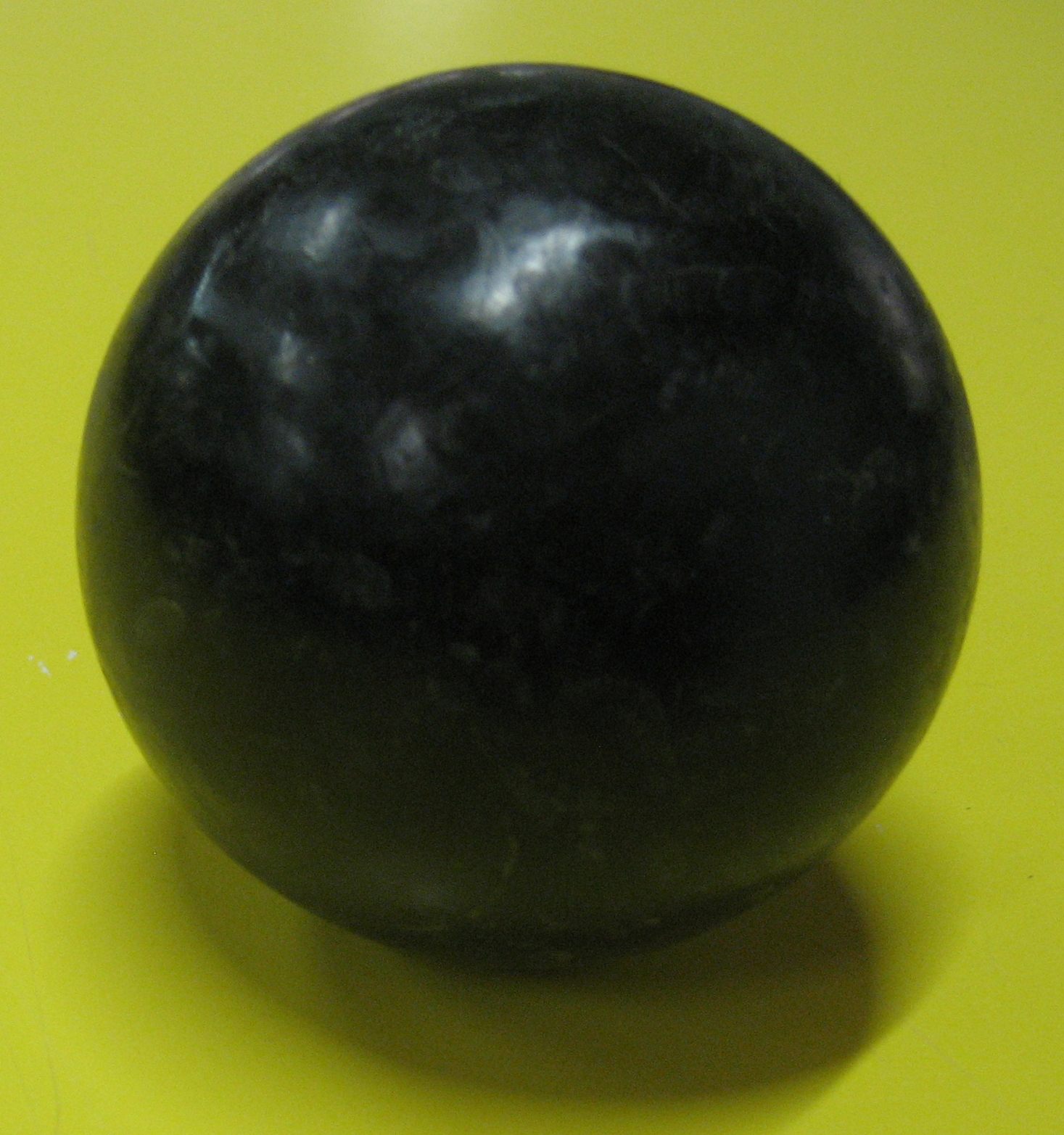
Roller hockey ball created via vulcanization

In ancient Mesoamerican cultures, rubber was used to make balls, sandal soles, elastic bands, and waterproof containers. It was cured using sulfur-rich plant juices, an early form of vulcanization.

In the 1830s, Charles Goodyear worked to devise a process for strengthening rubber tires. Tires of the time would become soft and sticky with heat, accumulating road debris. Goodyear tried heating rubber in order to mix other chemicals with it. This seemed to harden and improve the rubber, though this was due to the heating itself and not the chemicals used. Not realizing this, he repeatedly ran into setbacks when his announced hardening formulas did not work consistently. One day in 1839, when trying to mix rubber with sulfur, Goodyear accidentally dropped the mixture in a hot frying pan. To his astonishment, instead of melting further or vaporizing, the rubber remained firm and, as he increased the heat, the rubber became harder. Goodyear worked out a consistent system for this hardening, and by 1844 patented the process and was producing the rubber on an industrial scale.

On 21 November 1843, British inventor, Thomas Hancock took out a patent for the vulcanization of rubber using sulfur, eight weeks before Charles Goodyear did the same in the US (30 January 1844). Accounts differ as to whether Hancock's patent was informed by inspecting samples of American rubber from Goodyear and whether inspecting such samples could have provided information sufficient to recreate Goodyear's process.

== Applications ==
There are many uses for vulcanised materials, some examples of which are rubber hoses, shoe soles, toys, erasers, hockey pucks, shock absorbers, conveyor belts, vibration mounts/dampers, insulation materials, tires, and bowling balls. Most rubber products are vulcanised as this greatly improves their lifespan, function, and strength.

== Overview ==
In contrast with thermoplastic processes (the melt-freeze process that characterize the behaviour of most modern polymers), vulcanization, in common with the curing of other thermosetting polymers, is generally irreversible. Five types of curing systems are in common use:

1. Sulfur systems
2. Peroxides
3. Metallic oxides
4. Acetoxysilane
5. Urethane crosslinkers

== Vulcanization with sulfur ==
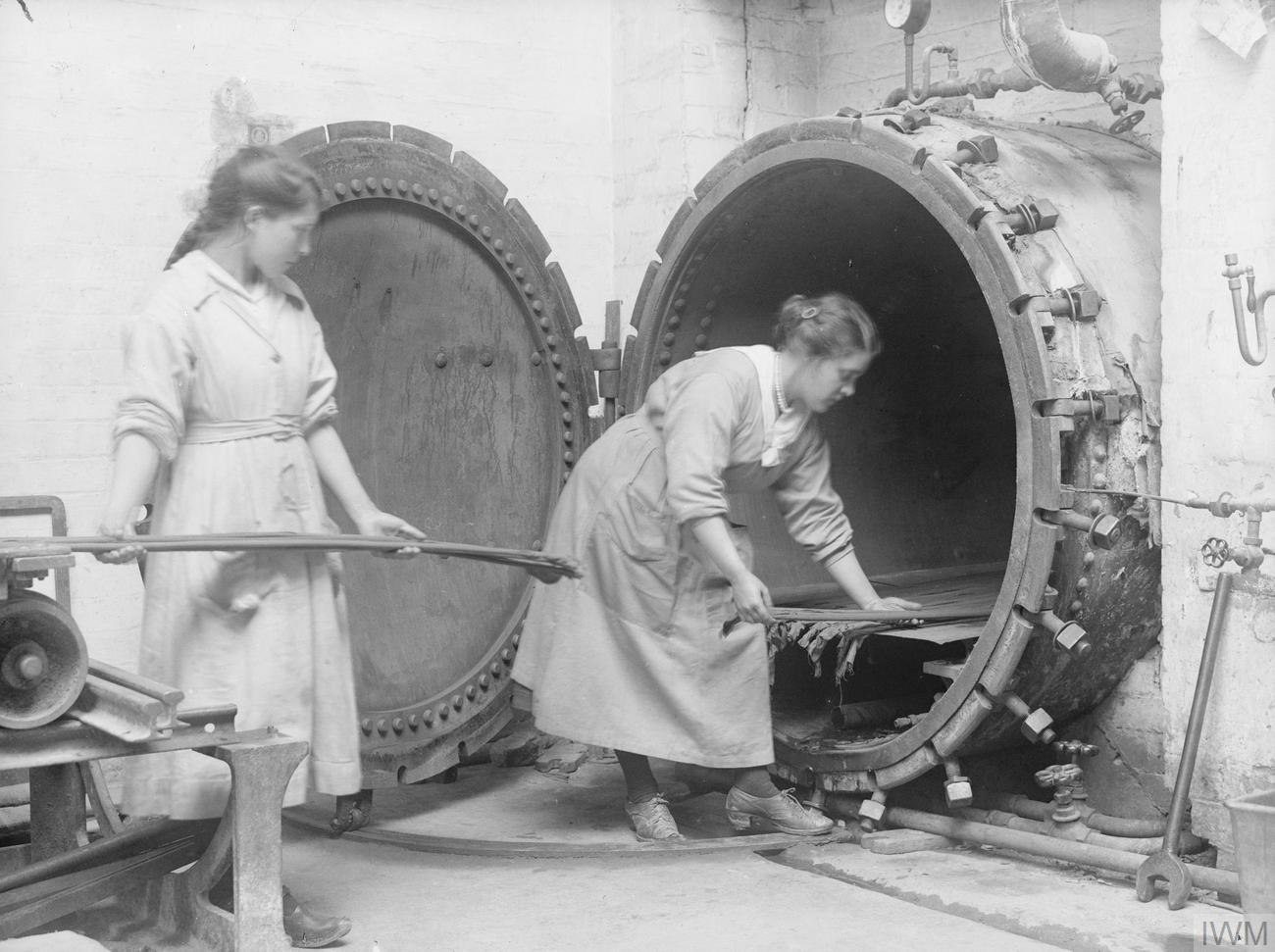
Two factory workers placing rubber tubing into a vulcaniser (1918)

The most common vulcanising methods depend on sulfur. Sulfur, by itself, is a slow vulcanising agent and does not vulcanise synthetic polyolefins. Accelerated vulcanization is carried out using various compounds that modify the kinetics of crosslinking; this mixture is often referred to as a cure package. The main polymers subjected to sulfur vulcanization are polyisoprene (natural rubber) and styrene-butadiene rubber (SBR), which are used for most street-vehicle tires. The cure package is adjusted specifically for the substrate and the application. The reactive sites—cure sites—are allylic hydrogen atoms. These C-H bonds are adjacent to carbon-carbon double bonds (>C=C<). During vulcanization, some of these C-H bonds are replaced by chains of sulfur atoms that link with a cure site of another polymer chain. These bridges contain between one and several atoms. The number of sulfur atoms in the crosslink strongly influences the physical properties of the final rubber article. Short crosslinks give the rubber better heat resistance. Crosslinks with higher number of sulfur atoms give the rubber good dynamic properties but less heat resistance. Dynamic properties are important for flexing movements of the rubber article, e.g., the movement of a side-wall of a running tire. Without good flexing properties these movements rapidly form cracks, and ultimately will make the rubber article fail.

== Vulcanization of polychloroprene ==
The vulcanization of neoprene or polychloroprene rubber (CR rubber) is carried out using metal oxides (specifically MgO and ZnO, sometimes Pb_{3}O_{4}) rather than sulfur compounds which are presently used with many natural and synthetic rubbers. In addition, because of various processing factors (principally scorch, this being the premature cross-linking of rubbers due to the influence of heat), the choice of accelerator is governed by different rules to other diene rubbers. Most conventionally used accelerators are problematic when CR rubbers are cured and the most important accelerant has been found to be ethylene thiourea (ETU), which, although being an excellent and proven accelerator for polychloroprene, has been classified as reprotoxic. From 2010 to 2013, the European rubber industry had a research project titled SafeRubber to develop a safer alternative to the use of ETU.

== Vulcanization of silicones ==
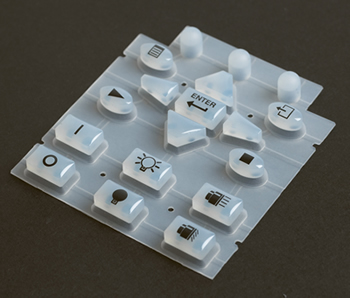
An example of a silicone rubber keypad typical of liquid silicone rubber (LSR) moulding

Room-temperature vulcanizing (RTV) silicone is constructed of reactive oil-based polymers combined with strengthening mineral fillers. There are two types of room-temperature vulcanising silicone:

1. RTV-1 (One-component systems); hardens due to the action of atmospheric humidity, a catalyst, and acetoxysilane. Acetoxysilane, when exposed to humid conditions, will form acetic acid. The curing process begins on the outer surface and progresses through to its core. The product is packed in airtight cartridges and is either in a fluid or paste form. RTV-1 silicone has good adhesion, elasticity, and durability characteristics. The Shore hardness can be varied between 18 and 60. Elongation at break can range from 150% up to 700%. They have excellent aging resistance due to superior resistance to UV radiation and weathering.
2. RTV-2 (Two-component systems); two-component products that, when mixed, cure at room-temperature to a solid elastomer, a gel, or a flexible foam. RTV-2 remains flexible from −80 to 250 °C (−112 to 482 °F). Break-down occurs at temperatures above 350 °C (662 °F), leaving an inert silica deposit that is non-flammable and non-combustible. They can be used for electrical insulation due to their dielectric properties. Mechanical properties are satisfactory. RTV-2 is used to make flexible moulds, as well as many technical parts for industry and paramedical applications.

== See also ==
- ISO 2921
- Polymer stabilizers
- Sulfur concrete
- Vulcanized fibre
- Vulcanizing shop
