= Tear resistance =

Materials engineering measurement

Tear resistance (or tear strength) is a measure of how well a material can withstand the effects of tearing. It is a useful engineering measurement for a wide variety of materials by many different test methods.

== Discussion ==
For example, with rubber, tear resistance measures how the test specimen resists the growth of any cuts when under tension, it is usually expressed in kN/m. Tear resistance can be gauged via the same ASTM D 412 apparatus used to measure tensile strength, modulus and elongation. ASTM D 624 can be applied to measure the resistance to the formation of a tear (tear initiation) and the resistance to the expansion of a tear (tear propagation). Regardless of which of these two is being measured, the sample is held between two holders and a uniform pulling force applied until the aforementioned deformation occurs. Tear resistance is then calculated by dividing the force applied by the thickness of the material.

Materials with low tear resistance sometimes have poor resistance to abrasion and when damaged will quickly fail (this includes hard materials, since hardness is not related to tear resistance).

== Tear resistance of different materials ==
Substances with high tear resistance include epichlorohydrin, natural rubber and polyurethane. In contrast, materials such as silicone and fluorosilicone have low tear resistance.

== Tear-yield ratio ==
The ratio of tear resistance to the yield strength is called the tear-yield ratio. It is a measure of notch toughness.

== Standards by ASTM International ==
- C1681-14 Standard Test Method for Evaluating the Tear Resistance of a Sealant Under Constant Strain
- D1004-13 Standard Test Method for Tear Resistance (Graves Tear) of Plastic Film and Sheeting
- D1922-15 Standard Test Method for Propagation Tear Resistance of Plastic Film and Thin Sheeting by Pendulum Method
- D1938-14 Standard Test Method for Tear-Propagation Resistance (Trouser Tear) of Plastic Film and Thin Sheeting by a Single-Tear Method
- D2212-00(2015) Standard Test Method for Slit Tear Resistance of Leather
- D2582-16 Standard Test Method for Puncture-Propagation Tear Resistance of Plastic Film and Thin Sheeting
- D4932/D4932M-89(2014)e1 Standard Test Method for Fastener Rupture and Tear Resistance of Roofing and Waterproofing Sheets, Roll Roofing, and Shingles
- E604-15 Standard Test Method for Dynamic Tear Testing of Metallic Materials

== See also ==
- Landfill liner properties - tear resistance
- Tearing energy
- Fracture mechanics
