= Shore durometer =

Hardness-testing device

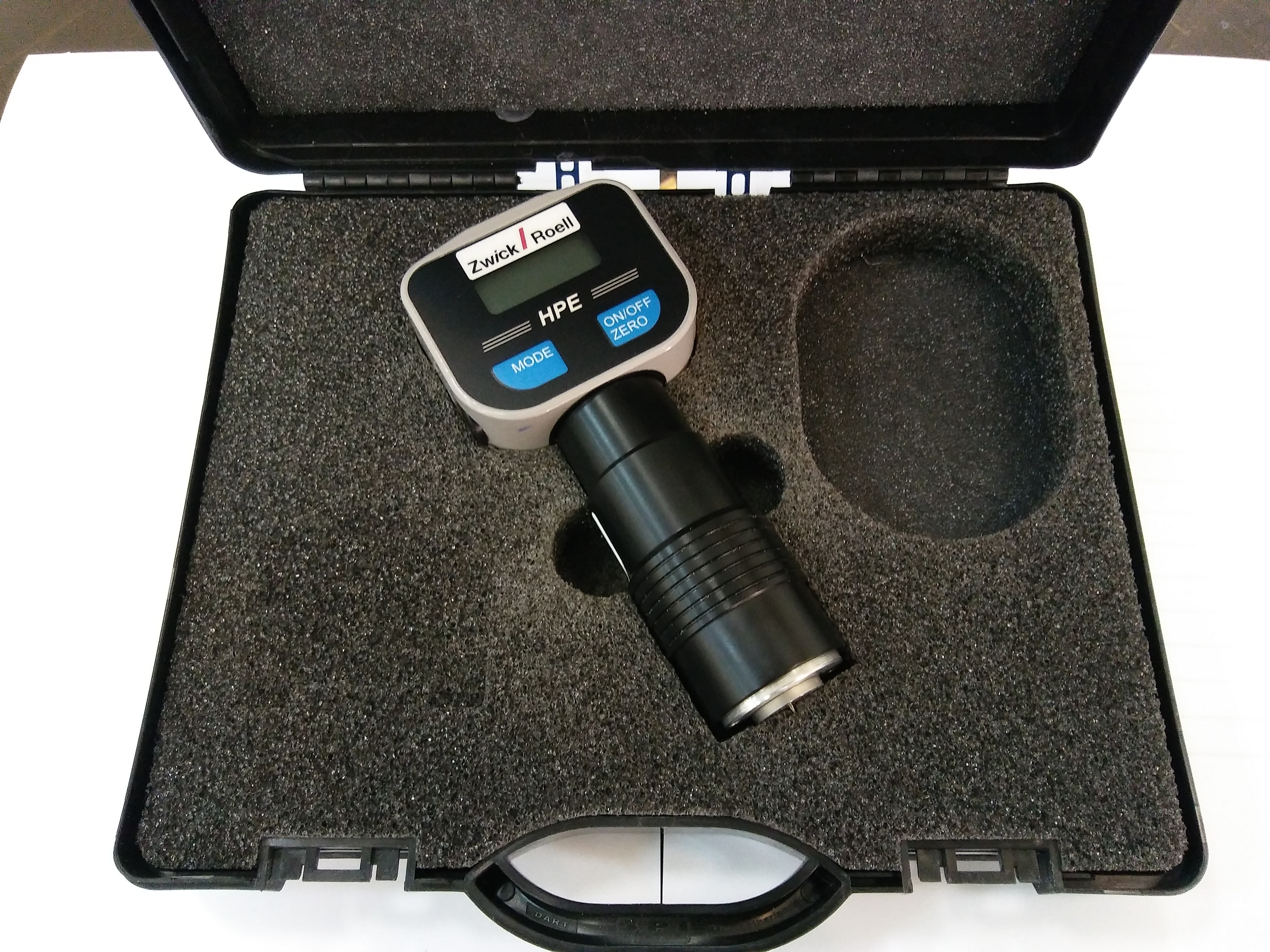
Digital Shore hardness tester

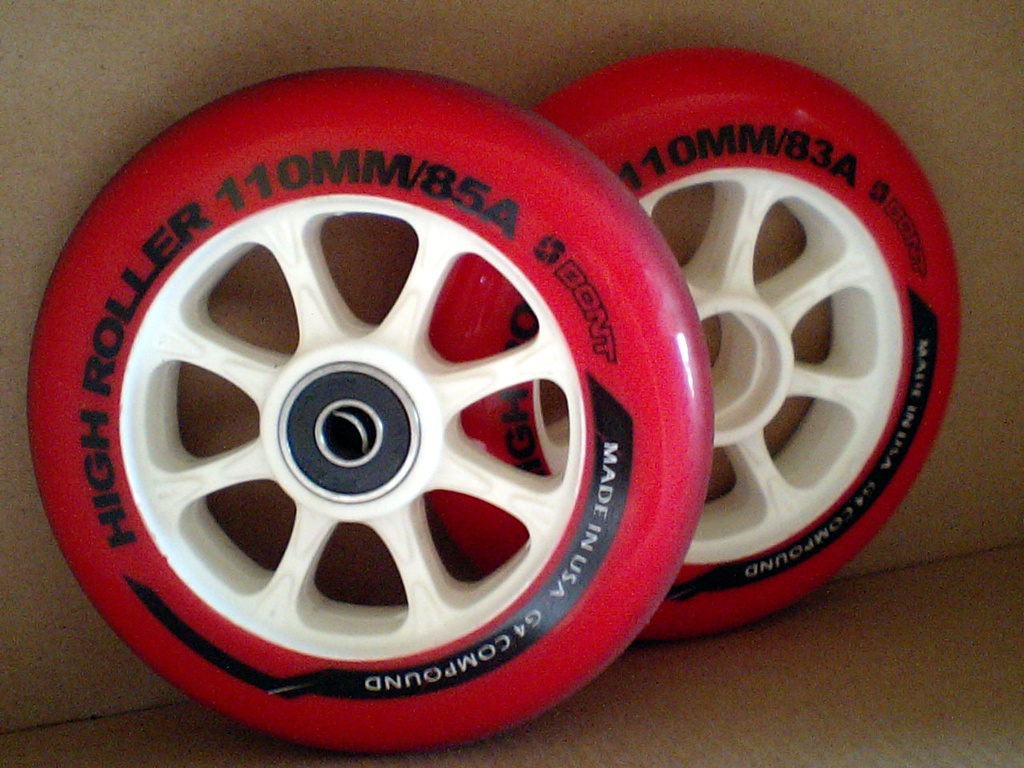
Two inline skate wheels with different durometer – 85A and 83A

The Shore durometer is a device for measuring the hardness of a material, typically of polymers.

Higher numbers on the scale indicate a greater resistance to indentation and thus harder materials. Lower numbers indicate less resistance and softer materials. Note that 'hardness' here is used in the colloquial sense, since a Shore durometer measures resistance to any localized deformation, in contrast with the technical definition (used in the article on hardness), which only concerns resistance to localized plastic deformation.

The term is also used to describe a material's rating on the scale, as in an object having a "'Shore durometer' of 90."

The scale was defined by Albert Ferdinand Shore, who developed a suitable device to measure hardness in the 1920s. It was neither the first hardness tester nor the first to be called a durometer (ISV duro- and -meter; attested since the 19th century), but today that name usually refers to Shore hardness; other devices use other measures, which return corresponding results, such as for Rockwell hardness.

== Durometer scales ==
There are several scales of durometer, used for materials with different properties. The two most common scales, using slightly different measurement systems, are the ASTM D2240 type A and type D scales.

The A scale is for softer ones, while the D scale is for harder ones. The image of Bareiss digital durometer is shown in the photo.

However, the ASTM D2240-00 testing standard calls for a total of 12 scales, depending on the intended use: types A, B, C, D, DO, E, M, O, OO, OOO, OOO-S, and R. Each scale results in a value between 0 and 100, with higher values indicating a harder material.

== Method of measurement ==
Diagram of a durometer indenter or presser foot used for Shores A and D

Durometer, like many other hardness tests, measures the depth of an indentation in the material created by a given force on a standardized presser foot. This depth is dependent on the hardness of the material, its viscoelastic properties, the shape of the presser foot, and the duration of the test. ASTM D2240 durometers allow for a measurement of the initial hardness, or the indentation hardness after a given period of time. The basic test requires applying the force in a consistent manner, without shock, and measuring the hardness (depth of the indentation). If a timed hardness is desired, force is applied for the required time and then read. The material under test should be a minimum of 6 mm (0.24 in) thick. Theoretical background of the test is considered in Stoßprobleme in Physik, Technik und Medizin: Grundlagen und Anwendungen.

Test setup for type A & D
Durometer	Indenting foot	Kilogram-force (kgf)	Newton (N)
Type A	Hardened steel rod 1.1–1.4 mm (0.043–0.055 in) diameter, with a truncated 35° cone, 0.79 mm (0.031 in) diameter	0.822	8.061
Type D	Hardened steel rod 1.1–1.4 mm (0.043–0.055 in) diameter, with a 30° conical point, 0.1 mm (0.0039 in) radius tip	0.822	8.061

The ASTM D2240 standard recognizes twelve different durometer scales using combinations of specific spring forces and indentor configurations. These scales are properly referred to as durometer types; i.e., a durometer type is specifically designed to determine a specific scale, and the scale does not exist separately from the durometer. The table below provides details for each of these types, with the exception of Type R.

Durometer type	Configuration	Diameter	Extension	Spring force
A	35° truncated cone (frustum)	1.40 mm (0.055 in)	2.54 mm (0.100 in)	8.05 N (821 gf)
B	30° cone	1.40 mm (0.055 in)	2.54 mm (0.100 in)	8.05 N (821 gf)
C	35° truncated cone (frustum)	1.40 mm (0.055 in)	2.54 mm (0.100 in)	44.45 N (4,533 gf)
D	30° cone	1.40 mm (0.055 in)	2.54 mm (0.100 in)	44.45 N (4,533 gf)
E	2.5 mm (0.098 in) spherical radius	4.50 mm (0.177 in)	2.54 mm (0.100 in)	8.05 N (821 gf)
M	30° cone	0.79 mm (0.031 in)	1.25 mm (0.049 in)	0.765 N (78.0 gf)
O	1.20 mm (0.047 in) spherical radius	2.40 mm (0.094 in)	2.54 mm (0.100 in)	8.05 N (821 gf)
OO	1.20 mm (0.047 in) spherical radius	2.40 mm (0.094 in)	2.54 mm (0.100 in)	1.111 N (113.3 gf)
DO	1.20 mm (0.047 in) spherical radius	2.40 mm (0.094 in)	2.54 mm (0.100 in)	44.45 N (4,533 gf)
OOO	6.35 mm (0.250 in) spherical radius	10.7–11.6 mm (0.42–0.46 in)	2.54 mm (0.100 in)	1.111 N (113.3 gf)
OOO-S	10.7 mm (0.42 in) radius disk	11.9 mm (0.47 in)	5.0 mm (0.20 in)	1.932 N (197.0 gf)

Note: Type R is a designation, rather than a true "type". The R designation specifies a presser foot diameter (hence the R, for radius; obviously D could not be used) of 18 ± 0.5 mm (0.71 ± 0.020 in) in diameter, while the spring forces and indenter configurations remain unchanged. The R designation is applicable to any D2240 Type, with the exception of Type M; the R designation is expressed as Type xR, where x is the D2240 type, e.g., aR, dR, etc.; the R designation also mandates the employment of an operating stand.

Some conditions and procedures that have to be met, according to DIN ISO 7619-1 standard are:

- For measuring Shore A the foot indents the material while for Shore D the foot penetrates the surface of the material.
- Material for testing needs to be in laboratory climate storage at least one hour before testing.
- Measuring time is 15s.
- Force is 1 + 0.1 kg (2.20 + 0.22 lb) for Shore A, and 5 + 0.5 kg (11.0 + 1.1 lb) for Shore D.
- Five measurements need to be taken.
- Calibration of the Durometer is one per week with elastomer blocks of different hardness.

The final value of the hardness depends on the depth of the indenter after it has been applied for 15 seconds on the material. If the indenter penetrates 2.54 mm (0.100 in) or more into the material, the durometer is 0 for that scale. If it does not penetrate at all, then the durometer is 100 for that scale. It is for this reason that multiple scales exist. But if the hardness is <10 °Sh or >90 °Sh the results are not to be trusted. The measurement must be redone with adjacent scale type.

Pig sticker used to measure the hardness of pugged clay

Durometer is a dimensionless quantity, and there is no simple relationship between a material's durometer in one scale, and its durometer in any other scale, or by any other hardness test.

Shore Durometers of Common Materials
Material	Durometer	Scale
Bicycle gel seat	15–30	OO
Chewing gum	20	OO
Sorbothane	30–70	OO
Rubber band	25	A
Door seal	55	A
Automotive tire tread	70	A
Soft wheels of roller skates and skateboard	78	A
Hydraulic O-ring	70–90	A
Pneumatic O-ring	65–75	A
Hard wheels of roller skates and skateboard	98	A
Ebonite rubber	100	A
Solid truck tires	50	D
Hard hat (typically HDPE)	75	D
Nylon	80	D

== ASTM D2240 hardness and elastic modulus ==
Using linear elastic indentation hardness, a relation between the ASTM D2240 hardness and the Young's modulus for elastomers has been derived by Gent. Gent's relation has the form:

E = (0.0981(56 + 7.62336S))/(0.137505(254 - 2.54S))

where E is the Young's modulus in MPa and S is the ASTM D2240 type A hardness.

This relation gives a value of E = ∞ at S = 100 but departs from experimental data for S < 40.

Mix and Giacomin derive comparable equations for all 12 scales that are standardized by ASTM D2240.

Another relation, that fits the experimental data slightly better, is

S = 100 erf(3.186×10^{−4} E^{0.5})

where erf is the error function, and E is in units of Pa.

To make that a little more insightful, here is a list of Shore A values with their corresponding Young's modulus (in MPa), where "MPa" is computed from "ShoreA" using first formula, and then "AltShoreA" is computed from "MPa" using second formula :

ShoreA -> MPa -> Alt ShoreA
Shore A	MPa	Alt Shore A
10.0	0.413	22.776
20.0	0.732	30.011
30.0	1.142	36.989
40.0	1.690	44.191
50.0	2.456	51.986
60.0	3.605	60.772
70.0	5.520	71.024
80.0	9.351	83.175
90.0	20.844	96.032

A first-order estimate of the relation between ASTM D2240 type D hardness (for a conical indenter with a 15° half-cone angle) and the elastic modulus of the material being tested is

S_{D} = 100 - (20(-78.188 + √6113.36 + 781.88E))/E

where S_{D} is the ASTM D2240 type D hardness, and E is in MPa.

Another Neo-Hookean linear relation between the ASTM D2240 hardness value and material elastic modulus has the form

log_{10} E = 0.0235S - 0.6403,
$$\quad
S = \begin{cases}
S_\text{A} & \text{for}~20 < S_A < 80, \\
S_\text{D} + 50 & \text{for}~30 < S_D < 85,
\end{cases}$$

where S_{A} is the ASTM D2240 type A hardness, S_{D} is the ASTM D2240 type D hardness, and E is the Young's modulus in MPa.

== Patents ==
- US patent 1770045, A. F. Shore, "Apparatus for Measuring the Hardness of Materials", issued 1930-07-08
- US patent 2421449, J. G. Zuber, "Hardness Measuring Instrument", issued 1947-06-03

== See also ==
- Brinell hardness test – Brinell scale of hardness
- Bloom (test) – Test to measure strength of a gel
- Knoop hardness test – Test for mechanical hardness
- Leeb Rebound Hardness Test – Method of testing metal hardness
- Rockwell hardness test – Hardness scale
- Vickers hardness test – Hardness test
