= Gent hyperelastic model =

Model of rubber elasticity

The Gent hyperelastic material model is a phenomenological model of rubber elasticity that is based on the concept of limiting chain extensibility. In this model, the strain energy density function is designed such that it has a singularity when the first invariant of the left Cauchy-Green deformation tensor reaches a limiting value $I_m$.

The strain energy density function for the Gent model is

$$W = -\cfrac{\mu J_m}{2} \ln\left(1 - \cfrac{I_1-3}{J_m}\right)$$

where $\mu$ is the shear modulus and $J_m = I_m -3$.

In the limit where $J_m \rightarrow \infty$, the Gent model reduces to the Neo-Hookean solid model. This can be seen by expressing the Gent model in the form

$$W =- \cfrac{\mu}{2x}\ln\left[1 - (I_1-3)x\right] ~;~~ x := \cfrac{1}{J_m}$$

A Taylor series expansion of $\ln\left[1 - (I_1-3)x\right]$ around $x = 0$ and taking the limit as $x\rightarrow 0$ leads to

$$W = \cfrac{\mu}{2} (I_1-3)$$

which is the expression for the strain energy density of a Neo-Hookean solid.

Several compressible versions of the Gent model have been designed. One such model has the form (the below strain energy function yields a non zero hydrostatic stress at no deformation, refer for compressible Gent models).

$$W = -\cfrac{\mu J_m}{2} \ln\left(1 - \cfrac{I_1-3}{J_m}\right) + \cfrac{\kappa}{2}\left(\cfrac{J^2-1}{2} - \ln J\right)^4$$

where $J = \det(\boldsymbol{F})$, $\kappa$ is the bulk modulus, and $\boldsymbol{F}$ is the deformation gradient.

== Consistency condition ==
We may alternatively express the Gent model in the form

$$W = C_0 \ln\left(1 - \cfrac{I_1-3}{J_m}\right)$$

For the model to be consistent with linear elasticity, the following condition has to be satisfied:

$$2\cfrac{\partial W}{\partial I_1}(3)  = \mu$$

where $\mu$ is the shear modulus of the material. Now, at $I_1 = 3 (\lambda_i = \lambda_j = 1)$,

$$\cfrac{\partial W}{\partial I_1} = -\cfrac{C_0}{J_m}$$

Therefore, the consistency condition for the Gent model is

$$-\cfrac{2C_0}{J_m} = \mu\, \qquad \implies \qquad C_0 = -\cfrac{\mu J_m}{2}$$

The Gent model assumes that $J_m \gg 1$

== Stress-deformation relations ==
The Cauchy stress for the incompressible Gent model is given by

$$\boldsymbol{\sigma}  = -p~\boldsymbol{\mathit{I}} +
2~\cfrac{\partial W}{\partial I_1}~\boldsymbol{B}
= -p~\boldsymbol{\mathit{I}} + \cfrac{\mu J_m}{J_m - I_1 + 3}~\boldsymbol{B}$$

=== Uniaxial extension ===
Stress-strain curves under uniaxial extension for Gent model compared with various hyperelastic material models.

For uniaxial extension in the $\mathbf{n}_1$-direction, the principal stretches are $\lambda_1 = \lambda,~ \lambda_2=\lambda_3$. From incompressibility $\lambda_1~\lambda_2~\lambda_3=1$. Hence $\lambda_2^2=\lambda_3^2=1/\lambda$. Therefore,

$$I_1 = \lambda_1^2+\lambda_2^2+\lambda_3^2 = \lambda^2 + \cfrac{2}{{\lambda}} ~.$$

The left Cauchy-Green deformation tensor can then be expressed as

$$\boldsymbol{B} = \lambda^2~\mathbf{n}_1\otimes\mathbf{n}_1 + \cfrac{1}{\lambda}~(\mathbf{n}_2\otimes\mathbf{n}_2+\mathbf{n}_3\otimes\mathbf{n}_3) ~.$$

If the directions of the principal stretches are oriented with the coordinate basis vectors, we have

$$\sigma_{11} = -p + \cfrac{\lambda^2\mu J_m}{J_m - I_1 + 3} ~;~~
\sigma_{22} = -p + \cfrac{\mu J_m}{\lambda(J_m - I_1 + 3)} = \sigma_{33} ~.$$

If $\sigma_{22} = \sigma_{33} = 0$, we have

$$p =  \cfrac{\mu J_m}{\lambda(J_m - I_1 + 3)}~.$$

Therefore,

$$\sigma_{11} = \left(\lambda^2 - \cfrac{1}{\lambda}\right)\left(\cfrac{\mu J_m}{J_m - I_1 + 3}\right)~.$$

The engineering strain is $\lambda-1\,$. The engineering stress is

$$T_{11} = \sigma_{11}/\lambda =
\left(\lambda - \cfrac{1}{\lambda^2}\right)\left(\cfrac{\mu J_m}{J_m - I_1 + 3}\right)~.$$

=== Equibiaxial extension ===
For equibiaxial extension in the $\mathbf{n}_1$ and $\mathbf{n}_2$ directions, the principal stretches are $\lambda_1 = \lambda_2 = \lambda\,$. From incompressibility $\lambda_1~\lambda_2~\lambda_3=1$. Hence $\lambda_3=1/\lambda^2\,$. Therefore,

$$I_1 = \lambda_1^2+\lambda_2^2+\lambda_3^2 = 2~\lambda^2 + \cfrac{1}{\lambda^4} ~.$$

The left Cauchy-Green deformation tensor can then be expressed as

$$\boldsymbol{B} = \lambda^2~\mathbf{n}_1\otimes\mathbf{n}_1 + \lambda^2~\mathbf{n}_2\otimes\mathbf{n}_2+ \cfrac{1}{\lambda^4}~\mathbf{n}_3\otimes\mathbf{n}_3 ~.$$

If the directions of the principal stretches are oriented with the coordinate basis vectors, we have

$$\sigma_{11} = \left(\lambda^2 - \cfrac{1}{\lambda^4}\right)\left(\cfrac{\mu J_m}{J_m - I_1 + 3}\right) = \sigma_{22} ~.$$

The engineering strain is $\lambda-1\,$. The engineering stress is

$$T_{11} = \cfrac{\sigma_{11}}{\lambda} =
\left(\lambda - \cfrac{1}{\lambda^5}\right)\left(\cfrac{\mu J_m}{J_m - I_1 + 3}\right) = T_{22}~.$$

=== Planar extension ===
Planar extension tests are carried out on thin specimens which are constrained from deforming in one direction. For planar extension in the $\mathbf{n}_1$ directions with the $\mathbf{n}_3$ direction constrained, the principal stretches are $\lambda_1=\lambda, ~\lambda_3=1$. From incompressibility $\lambda_1~\lambda_2~\lambda_3=1$. Hence $\lambda_2=1/\lambda\,$. Therefore,

$$I_1 = \lambda_1^2+\lambda_2^2+\lambda_3^2 = \lambda^2 + \cfrac{1}{\lambda^2} + 1 ~.$$

The left Cauchy-Green deformation tensor can then be expressed as

$$\boldsymbol{B} = \lambda^2~\mathbf{n}_1\otimes\mathbf{n}_1 + \cfrac{1}{\lambda^2}~\mathbf{n}_2\otimes\mathbf{n}_2+ \mathbf{n}_3\otimes\mathbf{n}_3 ~.$$

If the directions of the principal stretches are oriented with the coordinate basis vectors, we have

$$\sigma_{11} = \left(\lambda^2 - \cfrac{1}{\lambda^2}\right)\left(\cfrac{\mu J_m}{J_m - I_1 + 3}\right) ~;~~ \sigma_{22} = 0 ~;~~ \sigma_{33} = \left(1 - \cfrac{1}{\lambda^2}\right)\left(\cfrac{\mu J_m}{J_m - I_1 + 3}\right)~.$$

The engineering strain is $\lambda-1\,$. The engineering stress is

$$T_{11} = \cfrac{\sigma_{11}}{\lambda} =
\left(\lambda - \cfrac{1}{\lambda^3}\right)\left(\cfrac{\mu J_m}{J_m - I_1 + 3}\right)~.$$

=== Simple shear ===
The deformation gradient for a simple shear deformation has the form

$$\boldsymbol{F} = \boldsymbol{1} + \gamma~\mathbf{e}_1\otimes\mathbf{e}_2$$

where $\mathbf{e}_1,\mathbf{e}_2$ are reference orthonormal basis vectors in the plane of deformation and the shear deformation is given by

$$\gamma = \lambda - \cfrac{1}{\lambda} ~;~~ \lambda_1 = \lambda ~;~~ \lambda_2 = \cfrac{1}{\lambda} ~;~~ \lambda_3 = 1$$

In matrix form, the deformation gradient and the left Cauchy-Green deformation tensor may then be expressed as

$$\boldsymbol{F} = \begin{bmatrix} 1 & \gamma & 0 \\ 0 & 1 & 0 \\ 0 & 0 & 1 \end{bmatrix} ~;~~
\boldsymbol{B} = \boldsymbol{F}\cdot\boldsymbol{F}^T = \begin{bmatrix} 1+\gamma^2 & \gamma & 0 \\ \gamma & 1 & 0 \\ 0 & 0 & 1 \end{bmatrix}$$

Therefore,

$$I_1 = \mathrm{tr}(\boldsymbol{B}) = 3 + \gamma^2$$

and the Cauchy stress is given by

$$\boldsymbol{\sigma} = -p~\boldsymbol{\mathit{1}} + \cfrac{\mu J_m}{J_m - \gamma^2}~\boldsymbol{B}$$

In matrix form,

$$\boldsymbol{\sigma} = \begin{bmatrix} -p +\cfrac{\mu J_m (1+\gamma^2)}{J_m - \gamma^2} & \cfrac{\mu J_m \gamma}{J_m - \gamma^2} & 0 \\ \cfrac{\mu J_m \gamma}{J_m - \gamma^2} & -p + \cfrac{\mu J_m}{J_m - \gamma^2} & 0 \\ 0 & 0 & -p + \cfrac{\mu J_m}{J_m - \gamma^2}
\end{bmatrix}$$

== See also ==
- Mooney-Rivlin solid
- Finite strain theory
- Stress measures
