= Yeoh hyperelastic model =

Phenomenological model of elastic materials

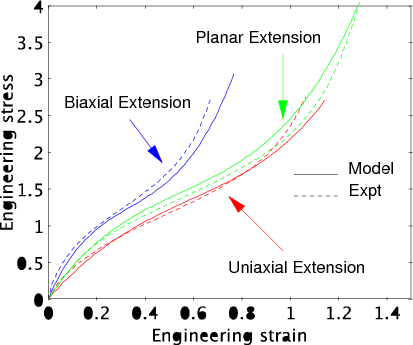
Yeoh model prediction versus experimental data for natural rubber. Model parameters and experimental data from PolymerFEM.com

The Yeoh hyperelastic material model is a phenomenological model for the deformation of nearly incompressible, nonlinear elastic materials such as rubber. The model is based on Ronald Rivlin's observation that the elastic properties of rubber may be described using a strain energy density function which is a power series in the strain invariants $I_1, I_2, I_3$ of the Cauchy-Green deformation tensors. The Yeoh model for incompressible rubber is a function only of $I_1$. For compressible rubbers, a dependence on $I_3$ is added on. Since a polynomial form of the strain energy density function is used but all the three invariants of the left Cauchy-Green deformation tensor are not, the Yeoh model is also called the reduced polynomial model.

== Yeoh model for incompressible rubbers ==
=== Strain energy density function ===
The original model proposed by Yeoh had a cubic form with only $I_1$ dependence and is applicable to purely incompressible materials. The strain energy density for this model is written as

$$W = \sum_{i=1}^3 C_i~(I_1-3)^i$$

where $C_i$ are material constants. The quantity $2 C_1$ can be interpreted as the initial shear modulus.

Today a slightly more generalized version of the Yeoh model is used. This model includes $n$ terms and is written as

$$W = \sum_{i=1}^n C_i~(I_1-3)^i ~.$$

When $n=1$ the Yeoh model reduces to the neo-Hookean model for incompressible materials.

For consistency with linear elasticity the Yeoh model has to satisfy the condition

$$2\cfrac{\partial W}{\partial I_1}(3) = \mu ~~(i \ne j)$$

where $\mu$ is the shear modulus of the material. Now, at $I_1 = 3 (\lambda_i = \lambda_j = 1)$,

$$\cfrac{\partial W}{\partial I_1} = C_1$$

Therefore, the consistency condition for the Yeoh model is

$$2C_1 = \mu\,$$

=== Stress-deformation relations ===
The Cauchy stress for the incompressible Yeoh model is given by

$$\boldsymbol{\sigma}  = -p~\boldsymbol{\mathit{1}} +
2~\cfrac{\partial W}{\partial I_1}~\mathrm{dev}(\boldsymbol{B}) ~;~~ \cfrac{\partial W}{\partial I_1} = \sum_{i=1}^n i~C_i~(I_1-3)^{i-1} ~.$$

==== Uniaxial extension ====
For uniaxial extension in the $\mathbf{n}_1$-direction, the principal stretches are $\lambda_1 = \lambda,~ \lambda_2=\lambda_3$. From incompressibility $\lambda_1~\lambda_2~\lambda_3=1$. Hence $\lambda_2^2=\lambda_3^2=1/\lambda$. Therefore,

$$I_1 = \lambda_1^2+\lambda_2^2+\lambda_3^2 = \lambda^2 + \cfrac{2}{\lambda} ~.$$

The left Cauchy-Green deformation tensor can then be expressed as

$$\boldsymbol{B} = \lambda^2~\mathbf{n}_1\otimes\mathbf{n}_1 + \cfrac{1}{\lambda}~(\mathbf{n}_2\otimes\mathbf{n}_2+\mathbf{n}_3\otimes\mathbf{n}_3) ~.$$

If the directions of the principal stretches are oriented with the coordinate basis vectors, we have

$$\sigma_{11} = -p + 2~\lambda^2~\cfrac{\partial W}{\partial I_1} ~;~~
\sigma_{22} = -p + \cfrac{2}{\lambda}~\cfrac{\partial W}{\partial I_1} = \sigma_{33} ~.$$

Since $\sigma_{22} = \sigma_{33} = 0$, we have

$$p = \cfrac{2}{\lambda}~\cfrac{\partial W}{\partial I_1} ~.$$

Therefore,

$$\sigma_{11} = 2~\left(\lambda^2 - \cfrac{1}{\lambda}\right)~\cfrac{\partial W}{\partial I_1}~.$$

The engineering strain is $\lambda-1\,$. The engineering stress is

$$T_{11} = \sigma_{11}/\lambda =
2~\left(\lambda - \cfrac{1}{\lambda^2}\right)~\cfrac{\partial W}{\partial I_1}~.$$

==== Equibiaxial extension ====
For equibiaxial extension in the $\mathbf{n}_1$ and $\mathbf{n}_2$ directions, the principal stretches are $\lambda_1 = \lambda_2 = \lambda\,$. From incompressibility $\lambda_1~\lambda_2~\lambda_3=1$. Hence $\lambda_3=1/\lambda^2\,$. Therefore,

$$I_1 = \lambda_1^2+\lambda_2^2+\lambda_3^2 = 2~\lambda^2 + \cfrac{1}{\lambda^4} ~.$$

The left Cauchy-Green deformation tensor can then be expressed as

$$\boldsymbol{B} = \lambda^2~\mathbf{n}_1\otimes\mathbf{n}_1 + \lambda^2~\mathbf{n}_2\otimes\mathbf{n}_2+ \cfrac{1}{\lambda^4}~\mathbf{n}_3\otimes\mathbf{n}_3 ~.$$

If the directions of the principal stretches are oriented with the coordinate basis vectors, we have

$$\sigma_{11} = -p + 2~\lambda^2~\cfrac{\partial W}{\partial I_1} = \sigma_{22} ~;~~
\sigma_{33} = -p + \cfrac{2}{\lambda^4}~\cfrac{\partial W}{\partial I_1} ~.$$

Since $\sigma_{33} = 0$, we have

$$p = \cfrac{2}{\lambda^4}~\cfrac{\partial W}{\partial I_1} ~.$$

Therefore,

$$\sigma_{11} = 2~\left(\lambda^2 - \cfrac{1}{\lambda^4}\right)~\cfrac{\partial W}{\partial I_1} = \sigma_{22} ~.$$

The engineering strain is $\lambda-1\,$. The engineering stress is

$$T_{11} = \cfrac{\sigma_{11}}{\lambda} =
2~\left(\lambda - \cfrac{1}{\lambda^5}\right)~\cfrac{\partial W}{\partial I_1} = T_{22}~.$$

==== Planar extension ====
Planar extension tests are carried out on thin specimens which are constrained from deforming in one direction. For planar extension in the $\mathbf{n}_1$ directions with the $\mathbf{n}_3$ direction constrained, the principal stretches are $\lambda_1=\lambda, ~\lambda_3=1$. From incompressibility $\lambda_1~\lambda_2~\lambda_3=1$. Hence $\lambda_2=1/\lambda\,$. Therefore,

$$I_1 = \lambda_1^2+\lambda_2^2+\lambda_3^2 = \lambda^2 + \cfrac{1}{\lambda^2} + 1 ~.$$

The left Cauchy-Green deformation tensor can then be expressed as

$$\boldsymbol{B} = \lambda^2~\mathbf{n}_1\otimes\mathbf{n}_1 + \cfrac{1}{\lambda^2}~\mathbf{n}_2\otimes\mathbf{n}_2+ \mathbf{n}_3\otimes\mathbf{n}_3 ~.$$

If the directions of the principal stretches are oriented with the coordinate basis vectors, we have

$$\sigma_{11} = -p + 2~\lambda^2~\cfrac{\partial W}{\partial I_1} ~;~~
\sigma_{22} = -p + \cfrac{2}{\lambda^2}~\cfrac{\partial W}{\partial I_1} ~;~~
\sigma_{33} = -p + 2~\cfrac{\partial W}{\partial I_1} ~.$$

Since $\sigma_{22} = 0$, we have

$$p = \cfrac{2}{\lambda^2}~\cfrac{\partial W}{\partial I_1} ~.$$

Therefore,

$$\sigma_{11} = 2~\left(\lambda^2 - \cfrac{1}{\lambda^2}\right)~\cfrac{\partial W}{\partial I_1} ~;~~ \sigma_{22} = 0 ~;~~ \sigma_{33} = 2~\left(1 - \cfrac{1}{\lambda^2}\right)~\cfrac{\partial W}{\partial I_1}~.$$

The engineering strain is $\lambda-1\,$. The engineering stress is

$$T_{11} = \cfrac{\sigma_{11}}{\lambda} =
2~\left(\lambda - \cfrac{1}{\lambda^3}\right)~\cfrac{\partial W}{\partial I_1}~.$$

== Yeoh model for compressible rubbers ==
A version of the Yeoh model that includes $I_3 = J^2$ dependence is used for compressible rubbers. The strain energy density function for this model is written as

$$W = \sum_{i=1}^n C_{i0}~(\bar{I}_1-3)^i + \sum_{k=1}^n C_{k1}~(J-1)^{2k}$$

where $\bar{I}_1 = J^{-2/3}~I_1$, and $C_{i0}, C_{k1}$ are material constants. The quantity $C_{10}$ is interpreted as half the initial shear modulus, while $C_{11}$ is interpreted as half the initial bulk modulus.

When $n=1$ the compressible Yeoh model reduces to the neo-Hookean model for incompressible materials.

== History ==
The model is named after Oon Hock Yeoh. Yeoh completed his doctoral studies under Graham Lake at the University of London. Yeoh held research positions at Freudenberg-NOK, MRPRA (England), Rubber Research Institute of Malaysia (Malaysia), University of Akron, GenCorp Research, and Lord Corporation. Yeoh won the 2004 Melvin Mooney Distinguished Technology Award from the ACS Rubber Division.

== See also ==
- Mooney-Rivlin solid
- Finite strain theory
- Stress measures
