= Polynomial hyperelastic model =

The polynomial hyperelastic material model is a phenomenological model of rubber elasticity. In this model, the strain energy density function is of the form of a polynomial in the two invariants $I_1,I_2$ of the left Cauchy-Green deformation tensor.

The strain energy density function for the polynomial model is

$$W = \sum_{i,j=0}^n C_{ij} (I_1 - 3)^i (I_2 - 3)^j$$

where $C_{ij}$ are material constants and $C_{00}=0$.

For compressible materials, a dependence of volume is added

$$W = \sum_{i,j=0}^n C_{ij} (\bar{I}_1 - 3)^i (\bar{I}_2 - 3)^j + \sum_{k=1}^m \frac{1}{D_{k}}(J-1)^{2k}$$

where

$$\begin{align}
\bar{I}_1 & = J^{-2/3}~I_1 ~;~~ I_1 = \lambda_1^2 +  \lambda_2 ^2+ \lambda_3 ^2 ~;~~ J = \det(\boldsymbol{F}) \\
\bar{I}_2 & = J^{-4/3}~I_2 ~;~~ I_2 = \lambda_1^2 \lambda_2^2 +  \lambda_2^2 \lambda_3^2 + \lambda_3^2 \lambda_1^2
\end{align}$$

In the limit where $C_{01}=C_{11}=0$, the polynomial model reduces to the Neo-Hookean solid model. For a compressible Mooney–Rivlin material $n = 1, C_{01} = C_2, C_{11} = 0, C_{10} = C_1, m=1$ and we have

$$W = C_{01}~(\bar{I}_2 - 3) + C_{10}~(\bar{I}_1 - 3) + \frac{1}{D_1}~(J-1)^2$$

== See also ==
- Mooney-Rivlin solid
- Finite strain theory
- Stress measures
