= Strain energy density function =

Mathematical function for thermoelastic strain energy density

A strain energy density function or stored energy density function is a scalar-valued function that relates the strain energy density of a material to the deformation gradient.

$$W = \hat{W}(\boldsymbol{C}) = \hat{W}(\boldsymbol{F}^T\cdot\boldsymbol{F}) =\bar{W}(\boldsymbol{F}) = \bar{W}(\boldsymbol{B}^{1/2}\cdot\boldsymbol{R})=\tilde{W}(\boldsymbol{B},\boldsymbol{R})$$

Equivalently,

$$W = \hat{W}(\boldsymbol{C}) = \hat{W}(\boldsymbol{R}^T\cdot\boldsymbol{B}\cdot\boldsymbol{R}) =\tilde{W}(\boldsymbol{B},\boldsymbol{R})$$

where $\boldsymbol{F}$ is the (two-point) deformation gradient tensor, $\boldsymbol{C}$ is the right Cauchy–Green deformation tensor, $\boldsymbol{B}$ is the left Cauchy–Green deformation tensor, and $\boldsymbol{R}$ is the rotation tensor from the polar decomposition of $\boldsymbol{F}$.

For an anisotropic material, the strain energy density function $\hat{W}(\boldsymbol{C})$ depends implicitly on reference vectors or tensors (such as the initial orientation of fibers in a composite) that characterize internal material texture. The spatial representation, $\tilde{W}(\boldsymbol{B},\boldsymbol{R})$ must further depend explicitly on the polar rotation tensor $\boldsymbol{R}$ to provide sufficient information to convect the reference texture vectors or tensors into the spatial configuration.

For an isotropic material, consideration of the principle of material frame indifference leads to the conclusion that the strain energy density function depends only on the invariants of $\boldsymbol{C}$ (or, equivalently, the invariants of $\boldsymbol{B}$ since both have the same eigenvalues). In other words, the strain energy density function can be expressed uniquely in terms of the principal stretches or in terms of the invariants of the left Cauchy–Green deformation tensor or right Cauchy–Green deformation tensor and we have:

For isotropic materials,

$$W = \hat{W}(\lambda_1,\lambda_2,\lambda_3) = \tilde{W}(I_1,I_2,I_3) = \bar{W}(\bar{I}_1,\bar{I}_2,J) = U(I_1^c, I_2^c, I_3^c)$$

with

$$\begin{align}
\bar{I}_1 & = J^{-2/3}~I_1 ~;~~ I_1 = \lambda_1^2 + \lambda_2 ^2+ \lambda_3 ^2 ~;~~ J = \det(\boldsymbol{F}) \\
\bar{I}_2 & = J^{-4/3}~I_2 ~;~~ I_2 = \lambda_1^2 \lambda_2^2 + \lambda_2^2 \lambda_3^2 + \lambda_3^2 \lambda_1^2
\end{align}$$

For linear isotropic materials undergoing small strains, the strain energy density function specializes to

$W = \frac{1}{2}\sum_{i=1}^{3}\sum_{j=1}^{3}\sigma_{ij}\epsilon_{ij} = \frac{1}{2}(\sigma_x\epsilon_x+\sigma_y\epsilon_y+\sigma_z\epsilon_z+2\sigma_{xy}\epsilon_{xy}+2\sigma_{yz}\epsilon_{yz}+2\sigma_{xz}\epsilon_{xz})$

A strain energy density function is used to define a hyperelastic material by postulating that the stress in the material can be obtained by taking the derivative of $W$ with respect to the strain. For an isotropic hyperelastic material, the function relates the energy stored in an elastic material, and thus the stress–strain relationship, only to the three strain (elongation) components, thus disregarding the deformation history, heat dissipation, stress relaxation etc.

For isothermal elastic processes, the strain energy density function relates to the specific Helmholtz free energy function $\psi$,

$$W = \rho_0 \psi \;.$$

For isentropic elastic processes, the strain energy density function relates to the internal energy function $u$,

$$W = \rho_0 u \;.$$

== Examples ==
Some examples of hyperelastic constitutive equations are:

- Saint Venant–Kirchhoff
- Neo-Hookean
- Generalized Rivlin
- Mooney–Rivlin
- Ogden
- Yeoh
- Arruda–Boyce model
- Gent

== See also ==
- Finite strain theory
- Helmholtz and Gibbs free energy in thermoelasticity
- Hyperelastic material
- Ogden–Roxburgh model
