= Hyperelastic material =

Constitutive model for ideally elastic material

Stress–strain curves for various hyperelastic material models.

A hyperelastic or Green elastic material is a type of constitutive model for ideally elastic material for which the stress–strain relationship derives from a strain energy density function. The hyperelastic material is a special case of a Cauchy elastic material.

For many materials, linear elastic models do not accurately describe the observed material behaviour. The most common example of this kind of material is rubber, whose stress-strain relationship can be defined as non-linearly elastic, isotropic and incompressible. Hyperelasticity provides a means of modeling the stress–strain behavior of such materials. The behavior of unfilled, vulcanized elastomers often conforms closely to the hyperelastic ideal. Filled elastomers and biological tissues are also often modeled via the hyperelastic idealization. In addition to being used to model physical materials, hyperelastic materials are also used as fictitious media, e.g. in the third medium contact method.

Ronald Rivlin and Melvin Mooney developed the first hyperelastic models, the Neo-Hookean and Mooney–Rivlin solids. Many other hyperelastic models have since been developed. Other widely used hyperelastic material models include the Ogden model and the Arruda–Boyce model.

== Hyperelastic material models ==
=== Saint Venant–Kirchhoff model ===
The simplest hyperelastic material model is the Saint Venant–Kirchhoff model which is just an extension of the geometrically linear elastic material model to the geometrically nonlinear regime. This model has the general form and the isotropic form respectively
$$\begin{align}
\boldsymbol{S} &= \boldsymbol{C} : \boldsymbol{E} \\
\boldsymbol{S} &= \lambda~ \text{tr}(\boldsymbol{E})\boldsymbol{\mathit{I}} + 2\mu\boldsymbol{E} \text{.}
\end{align}$$
where $\mathbin{:}$ is tensor contraction, $\boldsymbol{S}$ is the second Piola–Kirchhoff stress, $\boldsymbol{C} \in \R^{3 \times 3 \times 3 \times 3}$ is a fourth order stiffness tensor and $\boldsymbol{E}$ is the Lagrangian Green strain given by
$$\mathbf E =\frac{1}{2}\left[ (\nabla_{\mathbf X}\mathbf u)^\textsf{T} + \nabla_{\mathbf X}\mathbf u + (\nabla_{\mathbf X}\mathbf u)^\textsf{T} \cdot\nabla_{\mathbf X}\mathbf u\right]\,\!$$
$\lambda$ and $\mu$ are the Lamé constants, and $\boldsymbol{\mathit{I}}$ is the second order unit tensor.

The strain-energy density per unit volume (of the reference configuration) function for the Saint Venant–Kirchhoff model is
$$W(\boldsymbol{E}) = \frac{\lambda}{2}[\text{tr}(\boldsymbol{E})]^2 + \mu \text{tr}\mathord\left(\boldsymbol{E}^2\right)$$

and the second Piola–Kirchhoff stress can be derived from the relation
$$\boldsymbol{S} = \frac{\partial W}{\partial \boldsymbol{E}} ~.$$

=== Classification of hyperelastic material models ===
Hyperelastic material models can be classified as:

1. phenomenological descriptions of observed behavior
  - Fung
  - Mooney–Rivlin
  - Ogden
  - Polynomial
  - Saint Venant–Kirchhoff
  - Yeoh
  - Marlow
2. mechanistic models deriving from arguments about the underlying structure of the material
  - Arruda–Boyce model
  - Neo–Hookean model
  - Buche–Silberstein model
3. hybrids of phenomenological and mechanistic models
  - Gent
  - Van der Waals

Generally, a hyperelastic model should satisfy the Drucker stability criterion. Some hyperelastic models satisfy the Valanis-Landel hypothesis which states that the strain energy function can be separated into the sum of separate functions of the principal stretches $(\lambda_1, \lambda_2, \lambda_3)$:
$$W = f(\lambda_1) + f(\lambda_2) + f(\lambda_3) \,.$$

== Stress–strain relations ==
=== Compressible hyperelastic materials ===
==== First Piola–Kirchhoff stress ====
If $W(\boldsymbol{F})$ is the strain energy density function, the 1st Piola–Kirchhoff stress tensor can be calculated for a hyperelastic material as
$$\boldsymbol{P} = \frac{\partial W}{\partial \boldsymbol{F}} \qquad \text{or} \qquad P_{iK} = \frac{\partial W}{\partial F_{iK}}.$$
where $\boldsymbol{F}$ is the deformation gradient. In terms of the Lagrangian Green strain ($\boldsymbol{E}$)
$$\boldsymbol{P} = \boldsymbol{F}\cdot\frac{\partial W}{\partial \boldsymbol{E}} \qquad \text{or} \qquad P_{iK} = F_{iL}~\frac{\partial W}{\partial E_{LK}} ~.$$
In terms of the right Cauchy–Green deformation tensor ($\boldsymbol{C}$)
$$\boldsymbol{P} = 2~\boldsymbol{F}\cdot\frac{\partial W}{\partial \boldsymbol{C}} \qquad \text{or} \qquad P_{iK} = 2~F_{iL}~\frac{\partial W}{\partial C_{LK}} ~.$$

==== Second Piola–Kirchhoff stress ====
If $\boldsymbol{S}$ is the second Piola–Kirchhoff stress tensor then
$$\boldsymbol{S} = \boldsymbol{F}^{-1}\cdot\frac{\partial W}{\partial \boldsymbol{F}} \qquad \text{or} \qquad S_{IJ} = F^{-1}_{Ik}\frac{\partial W}{\partial F_{kJ}} ~.$$
In terms of the Lagrangian Green strain
$$\boldsymbol{S} = \frac{\partial W}{\partial \boldsymbol{E}} \qquad \text{or} \qquad
S_{IJ} = \frac{\partial W}{\partial E_{IJ}} ~.$$
In terms of the right Cauchy–Green deformation tensor
$$\boldsymbol{S} = 2~\frac{\partial W}{\partial \boldsymbol{C}} \qquad \text{or} \qquad
S_{IJ} = 2~\frac{\partial W}{\partial C_{IJ}} ~.$$
The above relation is also known as the Doyle-Ericksen formula in the material configuration.

==== Cauchy stress ====
Similarly, the Cauchy stress is given by
$$\boldsymbol{\sigma} = \frac{1}{J}~ \frac{\partial W}{\partial \boldsymbol{F}}\cdot\boldsymbol{F}^\textsf{T} ~;~~ J := \det\boldsymbol{F} \qquad \text{or} \qquad
\sigma_{ij} = \frac{1}{J}~ \frac{\partial W}{\partial F_{iK}}~F_{jK} ~.$$
In terms of the Lagrangian Green strain
$$\boldsymbol{\sigma} = \frac{1}{J}~\boldsymbol{F}\cdot\frac{\partial W}{\partial \boldsymbol{E}}\cdot\boldsymbol{F}^\textsf{T} \qquad \text{or} \qquad
\sigma_{ij} = \frac{1}{J}~F_{iK}~\frac{\partial W}{\partial E_{KL}}~F_{jL} ~.$$
In terms of the right Cauchy–Green deformation tensor
$$\boldsymbol{\sigma} = \frac{2}{J}~\boldsymbol{F}\cdot\frac{\partial W}{\partial \boldsymbol{C}}\cdot\boldsymbol{F}^\textsf{T} \qquad \text{or} \qquad
\sigma_{ij} = \frac{2}{J}~F_{iK}~\frac{\partial W}{\partial C_{KL}}~F_{jL} ~.$$
The above expressions are valid even for anisotropic media (in which case, the potential function is understood to depend implicitly on reference directional quantities such as initial fiber orientations). In the special case of isotropy, the Cauchy stress can be expressed in terms of the left Cauchy-Green deformation tensor as follows:
$$\boldsymbol{\sigma} = \frac{2}{J}\frac{\partial W}{\partial \boldsymbol{B}}\cdot~\boldsymbol{B} \qquad \text{or} \qquad
\sigma_{ij} = \frac{2}{J}~B_{ik}~\frac{\partial W}{\partial B_{kj}} ~.$$

=== Incompressible hyperelastic materials ===
For an incompressible material $J := \det\boldsymbol{F} = 1$. The incompressibility constraint is therefore $J-1= 0$. To ensure incompressibility of a hyperelastic material, the strain-energy function can be written in form:
$$W = W(\boldsymbol{F}) - p~(J-1)$$
where the hydrostatic pressure $p$ functions as a Lagrangian multiplier to enforce the incompressibility constraint. The 1st Piola–Kirchhoff stress now becomes
$$\boldsymbol{P}=-p~J\boldsymbol{F}^{-\textsf{T}} + \frac{\partial W}{\partial \boldsymbol{F}}
= -p~\boldsymbol{F}^{-\textsf{T}} + \boldsymbol{F}\cdot\frac{\partial W}{\partial \boldsymbol{E}}
= -p~\boldsymbol{F}^{-\textsf{T}} + 2~\boldsymbol{F}\cdot\frac{\partial W}{\partial \boldsymbol{C}} ~.$$
This stress tensor can subsequently be converted into any of the other conventional stress tensors, such as the Cauchy stress tensor which is given by
$$\boldsymbol{\sigma}=\boldsymbol{P}\cdot\boldsymbol{F}^\textsf{T} =
-p~\boldsymbol{\mathit{1}} + \frac{\partial W}{\partial \boldsymbol{F}}\cdot\boldsymbol{F}^\textsf{T}
= -p~\boldsymbol{\mathit{1}} + \boldsymbol{F}\cdot\frac{\partial W}{\partial \boldsymbol{E}}\cdot\boldsymbol{F}^\textsf{T}
= -p~\boldsymbol{\mathit{1}} + 2~\boldsymbol{F}\cdot\frac{\partial W}{\partial \boldsymbol{C}}\cdot\boldsymbol{F}^\textsf{T} ~.$$

== Expressions for the Cauchy stress ==
=== Compressible isotropic hyperelastic materials ===
For isotropic hyperelastic materials, the Cauchy stress can be expressed in terms of the invariants of the left Cauchy–Green deformation tensor (or right Cauchy–Green deformation tensor). If the strain energy density function is
$$W(\boldsymbol{F})=\hat{W}(I_1,I_2,I_3) = \bar{W}(\bar{I}_1,\bar{I}_2, J) = \tilde{W}(\lambda_1,\lambda_2, \lambda_3),$$
then
$$\begin{align}
\boldsymbol{\sigma} & =
\frac{2}{\sqrt{I_3}}\left[\left(\frac{\partial\hat{W}}{\partial I_1} + I_1~\frac{\partial\hat{W}}{\partial I_2}\right)\boldsymbol{B} - \frac{\partial\hat{W}}{\partial I_2}~\boldsymbol{B} \cdot\boldsymbol{B} \right] + 2\sqrt{I_3}~\frac{\partial\hat{W}}{\partial I_3}~\boldsymbol{\mathit{1}} \\[5pt]
& = \frac{2}{J}\left[\frac{1}{J^{2/3}}\left(\frac{\partial\bar{W}}{\partial \bar{I}_1} + \bar{I}_1~\frac{\partial\bar{W}}{\partial \bar{I}_2}\right)\boldsymbol{B} -
\frac{1}{J^{4/3}}~\frac{\partial\bar{W}}{\partial \bar{I}_2}~\boldsymbol{B} \cdot\boldsymbol{B} \right]
+ \left[\frac{\partial\bar{W}}{\partial J} - \frac{2}{3J} \left(\bar{I}_1~\frac{\partial\bar{W}}{\partial \bar{I}_1} + 2~\bar{I}_2~\frac{\partial\bar{W}}{\partial \bar{I}_2}\right)\right] ~\boldsymbol{\mathit{1}} \\[5pt]
& = \frac{2}{J} \left[\left(\frac{\partial\bar{W}}{\partial \bar{I}_1} + \bar{I}_1~\frac{\partial\bar{W}}{\partial \bar{I}_2}\right)\bar{\boldsymbol{B}} -
\frac{\partial\bar{W}}{\partial \bar{I}_2}~\bar{\boldsymbol{B}} \cdot\bar{\boldsymbol{B}} \right] + \left[\frac{\partial\bar{W}}{\partial J} - \frac{2}{3J}\left(\bar{I}_1~\frac{\partial\bar{W}}{\partial \bar{I}_1} + 2~\bar{I}_2~\frac{\partial\bar{W}}{\partial \bar{I}_2}\right)\right] ~\boldsymbol{\mathit{1}} \\[5pt]
& = \frac{\lambda_1}{\lambda_1\lambda_2\lambda_3}~\frac{\partial\tilde{W}}{\partial \lambda_1}~\mathbf{n}_1\otimes\mathbf{n}_1 + \frac{\lambda_2}{\lambda_1\lambda_2\lambda_3}~\frac{\partial\tilde{W}}{\partial \lambda_2}~\mathbf{n}_2\otimes\mathbf{n}_2 + \frac{\lambda_3}{\lambda_1\lambda_2\lambda_3}~\frac{\partial\tilde{W}}{\partial \lambda_3}~\mathbf{n}_3\otimes\mathbf{n}_3
\end{align}$$
(See the page on the left Cauchy–Green deformation tensor for the definitions of these symbols).

Proof 1

The second Piola–Kirchhoff stress tensor for a hyperelastic material is given by
$$\boldsymbol{S} = 2~\frac{\partial W}{\partial \boldsymbol{C}}$$
where $\boldsymbol{C} = \boldsymbol{F}^T\cdot\boldsymbol{F}$ is the right Cauchy–Green deformation tensor and $\boldsymbol{F}$ is the deformation gradient. The Cauchy stress is given by
$$\boldsymbol{\sigma} = \frac{1}{J}~\boldsymbol{F}\cdot\boldsymbol{S}\cdot\boldsymbol{F}^T
= \frac{2}{J}~\boldsymbol{F}\cdot\frac{\partial W}{\partial \boldsymbol{C}}\cdot\boldsymbol{F}^T$$
where $J = \det\boldsymbol{F}$. Let $I_1, I_2, I_3$ be the three principal invariants of $\boldsymbol{C}$. Then
$$\frac{\partial W}{\partial \boldsymbol{C}} =
\frac{\partial W}{\partial I_1}~\frac{\partial I_1}{\partial \boldsymbol{C}} +
\frac{\partial W}{\partial I_2}~\frac{\partial I_2}{\partial \boldsymbol{C}} +
\frac{\partial W}{\partial I_3}~\frac{\partial I_3}{\partial \boldsymbol{C}} ~.$$
The derivatives of the invariants of the symmetric tensor $\boldsymbol{C}$ are
$$\frac{\partial I_1}{\partial \boldsymbol{C}} = \boldsymbol{\mathit{1}} ~;~~
\frac{\partial I_2}{\partial \boldsymbol{C}} = I_1~\boldsymbol{\mathit{1}} - \boldsymbol{C} ~;~~
\frac{\partial I_3}{\partial \boldsymbol{C}} = \det(\boldsymbol{C})~\boldsymbol{C}^{-1}$$
Therefore, we can write
$$\frac{\partial W}{\partial \boldsymbol{C}} =
\frac{\partial W}{\partial I_1}~\boldsymbol{\mathit{1}} +
\frac{\partial W}{\partial I_2}~(I_1~\boldsymbol{\mathit{1}} - \boldsymbol{F}^T\cdot\boldsymbol{F}) +
\frac{\partial W}{\partial I_3}~I_3~\boldsymbol{F}^{-1}\cdot\boldsymbol{F}^{-T} ~.$$
Plugging into the expression for the Cauchy stress gives
$$\boldsymbol{\sigma}
= \frac{2}{J}~\left[\frac{\partial W}{\partial I_1}~\boldsymbol{F}\cdot\boldsymbol{F}^T+
\frac{\partial W}{\partial I_2}~(I_1~\boldsymbol{F}\cdot\boldsymbol{F}^T - \boldsymbol{F}\cdot \boldsymbol{F}^T \cdot \boldsymbol{F}\cdot \boldsymbol{F}^T) +
\frac{\partial W}{\partial I_3}~I_3~\boldsymbol{\mathit{1}}\right]$$
Using the left Cauchy–Green deformation tensor $\boldsymbol{B}=\boldsymbol{F}\cdot\boldsymbol{F}^T$ and noting that $I_3 = J^2$, we can write
$$\boldsymbol{\sigma}
= \frac{2}{\sqrt{I_3}}~\left[\left(\frac{\partial W}{\partial I_1} +
I_1~\frac{\partial W}{\partial I_2}\right)~\boldsymbol{B} -
\frac{\partial W}{\partial I_2}~\boldsymbol{B}\cdot\boldsymbol{B}\right] +
2~\sqrt{I_3}~\frac{\partial W}{\partial I_3}~\boldsymbol{\mathit{1}}~.$$
For an incompressible material $I_3 = 1$ and hence $W = W(I_1,I_2)$.Then
$$\frac{\partial W}{\partial \boldsymbol{C}} =
\frac{\partial W}{\partial I_1}~\frac{\partial I_1}{\partial \boldsymbol{C}} +
\frac{\partial W}{\partial I_2}~\frac{\partial I_2}{\partial \boldsymbol{C}}
= \frac{\partial W}{\partial I_1}~\boldsymbol{\mathit{1}} +
\frac{\partial W}{\partial I_2}~(I_1~\boldsymbol{\mathit{1}} - \boldsymbol{F}^T\cdot\boldsymbol{F})$$
Therefore, the Cauchy stress is given by
$$\boldsymbol{\sigma}
= 2\left[\left(\frac{\partial W}{\partial I_1} +
I_1~\frac{\partial W}{\partial I_2}\right)~\boldsymbol{B} -
\frac{\partial W}{\partial I_2}~\boldsymbol{B}\cdot\boldsymbol{B}\right] - p~\boldsymbol{\mathit{1}}~.$$
where $p$ is an undetermined pressure which acts as a Lagrange multiplier to enforce the incompressibility constraint.

If, in addition, $I_1 = I_2$, we have $W = W(I_1)$ and hence
$$\frac{\partial W}{\partial \boldsymbol{C}} =
\frac{\partial W}{\partial I_1}~\frac{\partial I_1}{\partial \boldsymbol{C}} = \frac{\partial W}{\partial I_1}~\boldsymbol{\mathit{1}}$$
In that case the Cauchy stress can be expressed as
$$\boldsymbol{\sigma} = 2\frac{\partial W}{\partial I_1}~\boldsymbol{B} - p~\boldsymbol{\mathit{1}}~.$$

Proof 2

The isochoric deformation gradient is defined as $\bar{\boldsymbol{F}}:=J^{-1/3}\boldsymbol{F}$, resulting in the isochoric deformation gradient having a determinant of 1, in other words it is volume stretch free. Using this one can subsequently define the isochoric left Cauchy–Green deformation tensor $\bar{\boldsymbol{B}} := \bar{\boldsymbol{F}}\cdot\bar{\boldsymbol{F}}^T=J^{-2/3}\boldsymbol{B}$. The invariants of $\bar{\boldsymbol{B}}$ are
$$\begin{align}
\bar I_1 &= \text{tr}(\bar{\boldsymbol{B}}) = J^{-2/3}\text{tr}(\boldsymbol{B}) = J^{-2/3} I_1 \\
\bar I_2 & = \frac{1}{2}\left(\text{tr}(\bar{\boldsymbol{B}})^2 - \text{tr}(\bar{\boldsymbol{B}}^2)\right) =
\frac{1}{2}\left( \left(J^{-2/3}\text{tr}(\boldsymbol{B})\right)^2 - \text{tr}(J^{-4/3}\boldsymbol{B}^2) \right) =
J^{-4/3} I_2 \\
\bar I_3 &= \det(\bar{\boldsymbol{B}}) = J^{-6/3} \det(\boldsymbol{B}) = J^{-2} I_3 = J^{-2} J^2 = 1
\end{align}$$
The set of invariants which are used to define the distortional behavior are the first two invariants of the isochoric left Cauchy–Green deformation tensor tensor, (which are identical to the ones for the right Cauchy Green stretch tensor), and add $J$ into the fray to describe the volumetric behaviour.

To express the Cauchy stress in terms of the invariants $\bar{I}_1, \bar{I}_2, J$ recall that
$$\bar{I}_1 = J^{-2/3}~I_1 = I_3^{-1/3}~I_1 ~;~~
\bar{I}_2 = J^{-4/3}~I_2 = I_3^{-2/3}~I_2 ~;~~ J = I_3^{1/2} ~.$$
The chain rule of differentiation gives us
$$\begin{align}
\frac{\partial W}{\partial I_1} & =
\frac{\partial W}{\partial \bar{I}_1}~\frac{\partial \bar{I}_1}{\partial I_1} +
\frac{\partial W}{\partial \bar{I}_2}~\frac{\partial \bar{I}_2}{\partial I_1} +
\frac{\partial W}{\partial J}~\frac{\partial J}{\partial I_1} \\
& = I_3^{-1/3}~\frac{\partial W}{\partial \bar{I}_1}
= J^{-2/3}~\frac{\partial W}{\partial \bar{I}_1} \\
\frac{\partial W}{\partial I_2} & =
\frac{\partial W}{\partial \bar{I}_1}~\frac{\partial \bar{I}_1}{\partial I_2} +
\frac{\partial W}{\partial \bar{I}_2}~\frac{\partial \bar{I}_2}{\partial I_2} +
\frac{\partial W}{\partial J}~\frac{\partial J}{\partial I_2} \\
& = I_3^{-2/3}~\frac{\partial W}{\partial \bar{I}_2}
= J^{-4/3}~\frac{\partial W}{\partial \bar{I}_2} \\
\frac{\partial W}{\partial I_3} & =
\frac{\partial W}{\partial \bar{I}_1}~\frac{\partial \bar{I}_1}{\partial I_3} +
\frac{\partial W}{\partial \bar{I}_2}~\frac{\partial \bar{I}_2}{\partial I_3} +
\frac{\partial W}{\partial J}~\frac{\partial J}{\partial I_3} \\
& = - \frac{1}{3}~I_3^{-4/3}~I_1~\frac{\partial W}{\partial \bar{I}_1}
- \frac{2}{3}~I_3^{-5/3}~I_2~\frac{\partial W}{\partial \bar{I}_2}
+ \frac{1}{2}~I_3^{-1/2}~\frac{\partial W}{\partial J} \\
& = - \frac{1}{3}~J^{-8/3}~J^{2/3}~\bar{I}_1~\frac{\partial W}{\partial \bar{I}_1}
- \frac{2}{3}~J^{-10/3}~J^{4/3}~\bar{I}_2~\frac{\partial W}{\partial \bar{I}_2}
+ \frac{1}{2}~J^{-1}~\frac{\partial W}{\partial J} \\
& = -\frac{1}{3}~J^{-2}~\left(\bar{I}_1~\frac{\partial W}{\partial \bar{I}_1}+
2~\bar{I}_2~\frac{\partial W}{\partial \bar{I}_2}\right) +
\frac{1}{2}~J^{-1}~\frac{\partial W}{\partial J}
\end{align}$$
Recall that the Cauchy stress is given by
$$\boldsymbol{\sigma}
= \frac{2}{\sqrt{I_3}}~\left[\left(\frac{\partial W}{\partial I_1} +
I_1~\frac{\partial W}{\partial I_2}\right)~\boldsymbol{B} -
\frac{\partial W}{\partial I_2}~\boldsymbol{B}\cdot\boldsymbol{B}\right] +
2~\sqrt{I_3}~\frac{\partial W}{\partial I_3}~\boldsymbol{\mathit{1}}~.$$
In terms of the invariants $\bar{I}_1, \bar{I}_2, J$ we have
$$\boldsymbol{\sigma}
= \frac{2}{J}~\left[\left(\frac{\partial W}{\partial I_1}+
J^{2/3}~\bar{I}_1~\frac{\partial W}{\partial I_2}\right)~\boldsymbol{B} -
\frac{\partial W}{\partial I_2}~\boldsymbol{B}\cdot\boldsymbol{B}\right] +
2~J~\frac{\partial W}{\partial I_3}~\boldsymbol{\mathit{1}}~.$$
Plugging in the expressions for the derivatives of $W$ in terms of $\bar{I}_1, \bar{I}_2, J$, we have
$$\begin{align}
\boldsymbol{\sigma}
& = \frac{2}{J}~\left[\left(J^{-2/3}~\frac{\partial W}{\partial \bar{I}_1} +
J^{-2/3}~\bar{I}_1~\frac{\partial W}{\partial \bar{I}_2}\right)~\boldsymbol{B} -
J^{-4/3}~\frac{\partial W}{\partial \bar{I}_2}~\boldsymbol{B}\cdot\boldsymbol{B}\right]
+ \\
& \qquad
2~J~\left[-\frac{1}{3}~J^{-2}~\left(\bar{I}_1~\frac{\partial W}{\partial \bar{I}_1}+
2~\bar{I}_2~\frac{\partial W}{\partial \bar{I}_2}\right) +
\frac{1}{2}~J^{-1}~\frac{\partial W}{\partial J}\right]~\boldsymbol{\mathit{1}}
\end{align}$$
or,
$$\begin{align}
\boldsymbol{\sigma}
& = \frac{2}{J}~\left[\frac{1}{J^{2/3}}~\left(\frac{\partial W}{\partial \bar{I}_1} +
\bar{I}_1~\frac{\partial W}{\partial \bar{I}_2}\right)~\boldsymbol{B} -
\frac{1}{J^{4/3}}~
\frac{\partial W}{\partial \bar{I}_2}~\boldsymbol{B}\cdot\boldsymbol{B}\right] \\
& \qquad + \left[\frac{\partial W}{\partial J} -
\frac{2}{3J}\left(\bar{I}_1~\frac{\partial W}{\partial \bar{I}_1}+
2~\bar{I}_2~\frac{\partial W}{\partial \bar{I}_2}\right)\right]\boldsymbol{\mathit{1}}
\end{align}$$
In terms of the deviatoric part of $\boldsymbol{B}$, we can write
$$\begin{align}
\boldsymbol{\sigma}
& = \frac{2}{J}~\left[\left(\frac{\partial W}{\partial \bar{I}_1} +
\bar{I}_1~\frac{\partial W}{\partial \bar{I}_2}\right)~\bar{\boldsymbol{B}} -
\frac{\partial W}{\partial \bar{I}_2}~\bar{\boldsymbol{B}}\cdot\bar{\boldsymbol{B}}\right] \\
& \qquad + \left[\frac{\partial W}{\partial J} -
\frac{2}{3J}\left(\bar{I}_1~\frac{\partial W}{\partial \bar{I}_1}+
2~\bar{I}_2~\frac{\partial W}{\partial \bar{I}_2}\right)\right]\boldsymbol{\mathit{1}}
\end{align}$$
For an incompressible material $J = 1$ and hence $W = W(\bar{I}_1,\bar{I}_2)$.Then the Cauchy stress is given by
$$\boldsymbol{\sigma}
= 2\left[\left(\frac{\partial W}{\partial \bar{I}_1} +
I_1~\frac{\partial W}{\partial \bar{I}_2}\right)~\bar{\boldsymbol{B}} -
\frac{\partial W}{\partial \bar{I}_2}~\bar{\boldsymbol{B}}\cdot\bar{\boldsymbol{B}}\right] - p~\boldsymbol{\mathit{1}}~.$$
where $p$ is an undetermined pressure-like Lagrange multiplier term. In addition, if $\bar{I}_1 = \bar{I}_2$, we have $W = W(\bar{I}_1)$ and hence the Cauchy stress can be expressed as
$$\boldsymbol{\sigma} = 2\frac{\partial W}{\partial \bar{I}_1}~\bar{\boldsymbol{B}} - p~\boldsymbol{\mathit{1}}~.$$

Proof 3

To express the Cauchy stress in terms of the stretches $\lambda_1, \lambda_2, \lambda_3$ recall that
$$\frac{\partial \lambda_i}{\partial\boldsymbol{C}} = \frac{1}{2\lambda_i}~\boldsymbol{R}^T\cdot(\mathbf{n}_i\otimes\mathbf{n}_i)\cdot\boldsymbol{R}~;~~
i = 1,2,3 ~.$$
The chain rule gives
$$\begin{align}
\frac{\partial W}{\partial\boldsymbol{C}} & =
\frac{\partial W}{\partial \lambda_1}~\frac{\partial \lambda_1}{\partial\boldsymbol{C}} +
\frac{\partial W}{\partial \lambda_2}~\frac{\partial \lambda_2}{\partial\boldsymbol{C}} +
\frac{\partial W}{\partial \lambda_3}~\frac{\partial \lambda_3}{\partial\boldsymbol{C}} \\
& = \boldsymbol{R}^T\cdot\left[\frac{1}{2\lambda_1}~\frac{\partial W}{\partial \lambda_1}~\mathbf{n}_1\otimes\mathbf{n}_1 +
\frac{1}{2\lambda_2}~\frac{\partial W}{\partial \lambda_2}~\mathbf{n}_2\otimes\mathbf{n}_2 +
\frac{1}{2\lambda_3}~\frac{\partial W}{\partial \lambda_3}~\mathbf{n}_3\otimes\mathbf{n}_3\right]\cdot\boldsymbol{R}
\end{align}$$
The Cauchy stress is given by
$$\boldsymbol{\sigma} = \frac{2}{J}~\boldsymbol{F}\cdot
\frac{\partial W}{\partial \boldsymbol{C}}\cdot\boldsymbol{F}^T =
\frac{2}{J}~(\boldsymbol{V}\cdot\boldsymbol{R})\cdot
\frac{\partial W}{\partial \boldsymbol{C}}\cdot(\boldsymbol{R}^T\cdot\boldsymbol{V})$$
Plugging in the expression for the derivative of $W$ leads to
$$\boldsymbol{\sigma} =
\frac{2}{J}~\boldsymbol{V}\cdot
\left[\frac{1}{2\lambda_1}~
\frac{\partial W}{\partial \lambda_1}~\mathbf{n}_1\otimes\mathbf{n}_1 +
\frac{1}{2\lambda_2}~
\frac{\partial W}{\partial \lambda_2}~\mathbf{n}_2\otimes\mathbf{n}_2 +
\frac{1}{2\lambda_3}~
\frac{\partial W}{\partial \lambda_3}~\mathbf{n}_3\otimes\mathbf{n}_3\right]
\cdot\boldsymbol{V}$$
Using the spectral decomposition of $\boldsymbol{V}$ we have
$$\boldsymbol{V}\cdot(\mathbf{n}_i\otimes\mathbf{n}_i)\cdot\boldsymbol{V} =
\lambda_i^2~\mathbf{n}_i\otimes\mathbf{n}_i ~;~~ i=1,2,3.$$
Also note that
$$J = \det(\boldsymbol{F}) = \det(\boldsymbol{V})\det(\boldsymbol{R}) = \det(\boldsymbol{V}) = \lambda_1 \lambda_2 \lambda_3 ~.$$
Therefore, the expression for the Cauchy stress can be written as
$$\boldsymbol{\sigma} =
\frac{1}{\lambda_1\lambda_2\lambda_3}~
\left[\lambda_1~\frac{\partial W}{\partial \lambda_1}~\mathbf{n}_1\otimes\mathbf{n}_1 +
\lambda_2~\frac{\partial W}{\partial \lambda_2}~\mathbf{n}_2\otimes\mathbf{n}_2 +
\lambda_3~\frac{\partial W}{\partial \lambda_3}~\mathbf{n}_3\otimes\mathbf{n}_3
\right]$$
For an incompressible material $\lambda_1\lambda_2\lambda_3 = 1$ and hence $W = W(\lambda_1,\lambda_2)$. Following Ogden p. 485, we may write
$$\boldsymbol{\sigma} =
\lambda_1~\frac{\partial W}{\partial \lambda_1}~\mathbf{n}_1\otimes\mathbf{n}_1 +
\lambda_2~\frac{\partial W}{\partial \lambda_2}~\mathbf{n}_2\otimes\mathbf{n}_2 +
\lambda_3~\frac{\partial W}{\partial \lambda_3}~\mathbf{n}_3\otimes\mathbf{n}_3
- p~\boldsymbol{\mathit{1}}~$$
Some care is required at this stage because, when an eigenvalue is repeated, it is in general only Gateaux differentiable, but not Fréchet differentiable. A rigorous tensor derivative can only be found by solving another eigenvalue problem.

If we express the stress in terms of differences between components,
$$\sigma_{11} - \sigma_{33} = \lambda_1~\frac{\partial W}{\partial \lambda_1} - \lambda_3~\frac{\partial W}{\partial \lambda_3} ~;~~
\sigma_{22} - \sigma_{33} = \lambda_2~\frac{\partial W}{\partial \lambda_2} - \lambda_3~\frac{\partial W}{\partial \lambda_3}$$
If in addition to incompressibility we have $\lambda_1 = \lambda_2$ then a possible solution to the problem requires $\sigma_{11} = \sigma_{22}$ and we can write the stress differences as
$$\sigma_{11} - \sigma_{33} = \sigma_{22} - \sigma_{33} = \lambda_1~\frac{\partial W}{\partial \lambda_1} - \lambda_3~\frac{\partial W}{\partial \lambda_3}$$

=== Incompressible isotropic hyperelastic materials ===
For incompressible isotropic hyperelastic materials, the strain energy density function is $W(\boldsymbol{F})=\hat{W}(I_1,I_2)$. The Cauchy stress is then given by
$$\begin{align}
\boldsymbol{\sigma} & = -p~\boldsymbol{\mathit{1}} +
2\left[\left(\frac{\partial\hat{W}}{\partial I_1} + I_1~\frac{\partial\hat{W}}{\partial I_2}\right)\boldsymbol{B} - \frac{\partial\hat{W}}{\partial I_2}~\boldsymbol{B} \cdot\boldsymbol{B} \right] \\
& = - p~\boldsymbol{\mathit{1}} + 2\left[\left(\frac{\partial W}{\partial \bar{I}_1} +
I_1~\frac{\partial W}{\partial \bar{I}_2}\right)~\bar{\boldsymbol{B}} -
\frac{\partial W}{\partial \bar{I}_2}~\bar{\boldsymbol{B}}\cdot\bar{\boldsymbol{B}}\right] \\
& = - p~\boldsymbol{\mathit{1}} + \lambda_1~\frac{\partial W}{\partial \lambda_1}~\mathbf{n}_1\otimes\mathbf{n}_1 +
\lambda_2~\frac{\partial W}{\partial \lambda_2}~\mathbf{n}_2\otimes\mathbf{n}_2 + \lambda_3~\frac{\partial W}{\partial \lambda_3}~\mathbf{n}_3\otimes\mathbf{n}_3
\end{align}$$
where $p$ is an undetermined pressure. In terms of stress differences
$$\sigma_{11} - \sigma_{33} = \lambda_1~\frac{\partial W}{\partial \lambda_1} - \lambda_3~\frac{\partial W}{\partial \lambda_3}~;~~
\sigma_{22} - \sigma_{33} = \lambda_2~\frac{\partial W}{\partial \lambda_2} - \lambda_3~\frac{\partial W}{\partial \lambda_3}$$
If in addition $I_1 = I_2$, then
$$\boldsymbol{\sigma} = 2\frac{\partial W}{\partial I_1}~\boldsymbol{B} - p~\boldsymbol{\mathit{1}}~.$$
If $\lambda_1 = \lambda_2$, then
$$\sigma_{11} - \sigma_{33} = \sigma_{22} - \sigma_{33} = \lambda_1~\frac{\partial W}{\partial \lambda_1} - \lambda_3~\frac{\partial W}{\partial \lambda_3}$$

== Consistency with linear elasticity ==
Consistency with linear elasticity is often used to determine some of the parameters of hyperelastic material models. These consistency conditions can be found by comparing Hooke's law with linearized hyperelasticity at small strains.

=== Consistency conditions for isotropic hyperelastic models ===
For isotropic hyperelastic materials to be consistent with isotropic linear elasticity, the stress–strain relation should have the following form in the infinitesimal strain limit:
$$\boldsymbol{\sigma} = \lambda~\mathrm{tr}(\boldsymbol{\varepsilon})~\boldsymbol{\mathit{1}} + 2\mu\boldsymbol{\varepsilon}$$
where $\lambda, \mu$ are the Lamé constants. The strain energy density function that corresponds to the above relation is
$$W = \tfrac{1}{2}\lambda~[\mathrm{tr}(\boldsymbol{\varepsilon})]^2 + \mu~\mathrm{tr}\mathord\left(\boldsymbol{\varepsilon}^2\right)$$
For an incompressible material $\mathrm{tr}(\boldsymbol{\varepsilon}) = 0$ and we have
$$W = \mu~\mathrm{tr}\mathord\left(\boldsymbol{\varepsilon}^2\right)$$
For any strain energy density function $W(\lambda_1,\lambda_2,\lambda_3)$ to reduce to the above forms for small strains the following conditions have to be met
$$\begin{align}
& W(1,1,1) = 0 ~;~~
\frac{\partial W}{\partial \lambda_i}(1,1,1) = 0 \\
& \frac{\partial^2 W}{\partial \lambda_i \partial \lambda_j}(1,1,1) = \lambda + 2\mu\delta_{ij}
\end{align}$$

If the material is incompressible, then the above conditions may be expressed in the following form.
$$\begin{align}
& W(1,1,1) = 0 \\
& \frac{\partial W}{\partial \lambda_i}(1,1,1) = \frac{\partial W}{\partial \lambda_j}(1,1,1) ~;~~
\frac{\partial^2 W}{\partial \lambda_i^2}(1,1,1) = \frac{\partial^2 W}{\partial \lambda_j^2}(1,1,1) \\
& \frac{\partial^2 W}{\partial \lambda_i \partial \lambda_j}(1,1,1) = \mathrm{independent of}~i,j\ne i \\
& \frac{\partial^2 W}{\partial \lambda_i^2}(1,1,1) - \frac{\partial^2 W}{\partial \lambda_i \partial \lambda_j}(1,1,1) + \frac{\partial W}{\partial \lambda_i}(1,1,1) = 2\mu ~~(i \ne j)
\end{align}$$
These conditions can be used to find relations between the parameters of a given hyperelastic model and shear and bulk moduli.

=== Consistency conditions for incompressible I_{1} based rubber materials ===
Many elastomers are modeled adequately by a strain energy density function that depends only on $I_1$. For such materials we have $W = W(I_1)$. The consistency conditions for incompressible materials for $I_1 = 3, \lambda_i = \lambda_j = 1$ may then be expressed as
$$\left.W(I_1)\right|_{I_1=3} = 0 \quad \text{and} \quad \left.\frac{\partial W}{\partial I_1}\right|_{I_1=3} = \frac{\mu}{2} \,.$$
The second consistency condition above can be derived by noting that
$$\frac{\partial W}{\partial \lambda_i} = \frac{\partial W}{\partial I_1}\frac{\partial I_1}{\partial \lambda_i} = 2\lambda_i\frac{\partial W}{\partial I_1} \quad\text{and}\quad
\frac{\partial^2 W}{\partial \lambda_i \partial \lambda_j} = 2\delta_{ij}\frac{\partial W}{\partial I_1} + 4\lambda_i\lambda_j \frac{\partial^2 W}{\partial I_1^2}\,.$$
These relations can then be substituted into the consistency condition for isotropic incompressible hyperelastic materials.

== See also ==
- Cauchy elastic material
- Continuum mechanics
- Deformation (mechanics)
- Finite strain theory
- Ogden–Roxburgh model
- Rubber elasticity
- Stress measures
- Stress (mechanics)
