= Alan Neville Gent =

English scientist (1927-2012)

- Born: 11 November 1927; United Kingdom
- Died: 20 September 2012 (aged 84); United States
- Education: University of London
- Known for: Adhesion, Rubber
- Awards: Bingham Medal (1975); Charles Goodyear Medal (1990); Colwyn medal (1977); Whitby Award (1987)
- Scientific career
- Fields: Polymer Science
- Workplaces: BRPRA, University of Akron
- Doctoral students: Tony Kinloch

Alan Neville Gent (11 November 1927 – 20 September 2012) was a British-American physicist. A professor at the University of Akron, he was recognized during his lifetime as a world-leading authority on the topics of adhesion physics, crystalline and glassy polymers, and the fracturing of rubber.

== Biography ==
Gent was born in Leicester, England. He obtained degrees in Physics and Mathematics at the University of London, and a doctorate in 1955 in the mechanics of deformation and fracture of rubber and plastics. At age 17, Gent worked as a research assistant at the John Bull Rubber Co. He served in the British Army from 1947 to 1949 before becoming a research physicist and later a principal physicist at the British Rubber Producer's Research Association.

In 1961, Gent joined the faculty of the University of Akron, where he spent almost half a century. He was an assistant director of the Institute of Polymer Science and dean of graduate studies and research in addition to being a researcher and professor. Gent discovered the Fletcher-Gent effect and developed the Gent hyperelastic model. He was involved in the investigation of the O-ring failure in the space shuttle Challenger disaster. Gent also published more than 200 works about rubber science. He was the editor and author of the textbook Engineering with Rubber and studied the conditions that cause cavitation in rubber under the action of hydrostatic tensile loading. His most frequently cited work proposed a hyperelastic stress-strain law for rubber. Gent received the 1975 Bingham Medal and the Colwyn Medal of the Plastics and Rubber Institute from the Institute of Materials, Minerals and Mining (IOM3) in 1978 and the George S. Whitby teaching award in 1987. Gent also received the Charles Goodyear Medal from the ACS Rubber Division in 1990.

He died on 20 September 2012 at the age of 85.
