= Third medium contact method =

Method of modelling contact between solids

Sliding contact of solids (black) through a third medium (white) using the third medium contact method with HuHu-regularization.

The third medium contact (TMC) is an implicit formulation used in contact mechanics. Contacting bodies are embedded in a highly compliant medium (the third medium), which becomes increasingly stiff under compression. The stiffening of the third medium allows tractions to be transferred between the contacting bodies when the third medium between the bodies is compressed. In itself, the method is inexact; however, in contrast to most other contact methods, the third medium approach is continuous and differentiable, which makes it applicable to applications such as topology optimization.

== History ==
TMC field timeline
← / TMC published; ← / Fully implicit formulation; ← / Revival of TMC through introduction of HuHu regularization and Topology optimization; ← / Friction; ← / Thermal contact; ← / HuHu-LuLu; ← / Gauss-Lobatto
(year)

The method was first proposed in 2013 by Peter Wriggers, Jörg Schröder, and Alexander Schwarz, where a St. Venant-Kirchhoff material was used to model the third medium. This approach required explicit treatment of surface normals and continued to be used until 2017, when Bog et al. simplified the method by applying a Hencky material with the inherent property of becoming rigid under ultimate compression. This property made the explicit treatment of surface normals redundant, transforming the third medium contact method into a fully implicit method, contrasting with the more widely used Mortar methods or Penalty methods. However, at this stage, the third medium contact method could only handle very small degrees of sliding, and a friction model for TMC had yet to be developed. The rising popularity of Mortar methods, which emerged in the same period with a rigorous mathematical foundation and rapid development and adoption, overshadowed the TMC method. Consequently, TMC was abandoned at an early stage and remained largely unknown in contact mechanics.

In 2021, the method was revived when Gore Lukas Bluhm, Ole Sigmund, and Konstantinos Poulios worked on nonlinear buckling problems and realized that a highly compliant void material could transfer forces in a topology optimization setting. Bluhm et al. added a new regularization to stabilize the third medium, enabling the method to contact problems involving moderate sliding and thus making it practically applicable. This novel regularization, known as HuHu regularization, is a general regularization technique for finite elements which has also been used outside TMC. The use of TMC in topology optimization was refined in subsequent work and applied to more complex problems.

In 2024, Frederiksen et al. proposed a crystal plasticity-inspired scheme to include friction. This involved adding a term to the material model to contribute to high shear stresses in the contact interface, along with a plastic slip scheme to release shear stresses and accommodate sliding. During the same period, new regularization methods were proposed, and the method was extended to thermal contact by Dalklint et al. and utilized for pneumatic actuation by Faltus et al. who also introduced Gauss-Lobatto integration to TMC, improving upon numerical stability and thus allowing for stable solution with lower stiffness values for the third medium.

== Principles ==
Notation conventions
$\bold{a} \cdot \bold{b} = a_i b_i$	Inner product
$\bold{a} \otimes \bold{b} = a_i b_j$	Outer product
$\bold{A}:\bold{B} = A_{ij} B_{ij}$	Double contraction
$\boldsymbol{\mathcal{A}}\, \boldsymbol{\scriptstyle{\vdots}} \, \boldsymbol{\mathcal{B}} = \mathcal{A}_{ijk} \mathcal{B}_{ijk}$	Triple contraction
$|\bold{A}| = \sqrt{\bold{A}\cdot \bold{A}}$	Determinant
$||\bold{A}|| = \sqrt{\bold{A}:\bold{A}}$	Frobenius norm
$\mathbb{H}\bold{a} = \dfrac{\partial^2 a_i}{\partial X_j \partial X_k}$	Hessian of a vector field $\bold{a}$
$\mathbb{L}\bold{a} = \dfrac{\partial^2 a_i}{\partial X_j \partial X_j}$	Laplacian of a vector field $\bold{a}$

=== Material model ===
Increasing strain energy density of neo-Hookean solid under uniaxial compression.

TMC relies on a material model for the third medium, which stiffens under compression. The most commonly applied material models are of a neo-Hookean type, characterized by a strain energy density function:

$W(\bold{u}) = \frac{K}{2}(\text{ln}|\bold{F}|)^2 + \frac{G}{2}\left( |\bold{F}|^{-2/3} ||\bold{F}| |^2 -3 \right)$,

where $K$ is the bulk modulus, $G$ is the shear modulus, and $\bold{F}=\nabla \bold{u}+\bold{I}$ is the deformation gradient tensor of the displacement field $\bold{u}$.

As the current material volume $|\bold{F}|$ approaches zero, this material model exhibits the characteristic of becoming infinitely stiff. Consequently, when the third medium is compressed, its volume remains positive and finite. This ensures that if two solids are embedded in a third medium with significantly lower bulk and shear moduli, the third medium can still transfer substantial forces to deform the solids when sufficiently compressed, as its stiffness becomes comparable to that of the embedded solids.

=== Regularization ===
Deformations targeted by HuHu and LuLu and selected element types where these deformations can be found.

While the neo-Hookean material model can be stable for contact without sliding, sliding often leads to instability. To address this, regularization techniques are applied to the strain energy density function.

Regularization is typically achieved by adding a regularization term to the strain energy density function of the material model. A common approach is the HuHu regularization, expressed as:

$\Psi(\bold{u}) = W(\bold{u}) + \mathbb{H}\bold{u} \, \boldsymbol{\scriptstyle{\vdots}} \, \mathbb{H}\bold{u}$,

where $\Psi(\bold{u})$ represents the augmented strain energy density of the third medium, $\mathbb{H}\bold{u} \, \boldsymbol{\scriptstyle{\vdots}} \, \mathbb{H}\bold{u}$ is the regularization term representing the inner product of the spatial Hessian of $\bold{u}$ by itself, and $W(\bold{u})$ is the underlying strain energy density of the third medium, e.g. a neo-Hookean solid or another hyperelastic material.

The HuHu regularization was the first regularization method specifically developed for TMC. A subsequent refinement is known as the HuHu-LuLu regularization, expressed as:

$\Psi(\bold{u}) = W(\bold{u}) + \mathbb{H}\bold{u} \, \boldsymbol{\scriptstyle{\vdots}} \, \mathbb{H}\bold{u} - \dfrac{1}{\mathrm{Tr}(\bold{I})}\mathbb{L} \bold{u} \cdot \mathbb{L} \bold{u}$,

where $\mathbb{L}\bold{u}$ is the Laplacian of the displacement field $\bold{u}$, and $\text{Tr}(\bold{I})$ is the trace of the identity matrix corresponding to the problem's dimension (2D or 3D). The LuLu term is designed to mitigate the penalization of bending and quadratic compression deformations while maintaining the penalization of excessive skew deformations, thus preserving the stabilizing properties of the HuHu regularization. This reduced penalization on bending deformations enhances the accuracy of modelling curved contacts, particularly beneficial when using coarse finite element meshes. Similarly, the reduced penalization on quadratic compression is advantageous in topology optimization applications, where finite elements with varying material densities undergo non-uniform compression.

An alternative and more complex regularization approach involves penalizing volume change and rotations, initially proposed by Faltus et al. This approach requires further extension to 3D applications. A later improvement by Wriggers et al. directly utilizes the rotation tensor $\bold{R}$ instead of the approximation used in Faltus et al..

=== Friction ===
A gap between a bulge and a solid bed is filled with a third medium ($\Omega_v$). The direction normal $\bold{n}_0$ and parallel $\bold{s}_0$ to the contact interface are defined based on the surface of the solid bed. Left and right boundaries are periodic and a displacement is enforced on $\Gamma_D$.

Sliding bulge problem solved with TMC friction (Blue) and a Lagrange multiplier approach (Black) for a friction coefficient of 0.3.

The integration of friction into the TMC method represents a significant advancement in simulating realistic contact conditions, addressing the previous limitations in replicating real-world scenarios. Currently, there is only one approach available for adding friction. This approach introduces shear stress to the contact and releases it through plastic slip if the contact is sliding.

When a neo-Hookean material model is used to represent the third medium, it exhibits much greater stiffness in compression compared to shear during contact. To address this and provide shear resistance, an anisotropic term is incorporated into the neo-Hookean material model. This modification rapidly builds up shear stress in compressed regions of the third medium, which is crucial for accurately modelling frictional contact.

In this formulation, the extended strain energy density expression with the added shear term is:

$W_{ext}(\bold{u}) = W(\bold{u}) + \dfrac{\beta}{2} \left( \bold{C}_e : ( \bold{s}_0 \otimes \bold{n}_0) \right)^2$,

where:

- $\beta$ is a scaling parameter,
- $\bold{s}_0$is a unit vector parallel to the direction of sliding,
- $\bold{n}_0$ is a unit vector perpendicular to the contact interface, and
- $\bold{C}_e = \bold{F}_e^T \cdot \bold{F}_e$ is the right Cauchy-Green tensor of the elastic deformation.

The shear extension works by penalising the contribution in $\bold{C}_e$ associated with shear in the slip direction $\bold{s}_0$.

To release the shear stresses at the onset of sliding, a framework inspired by crystal plasticity is employed. This includes a yield criterion specifically designed to replicate the effects of Coulomb friction. This framework allows the model to simulate the onset of sliding when the shear stress, provided by the added anisotropic term, exceeds a certain threshold, effectively mimicking real-world frictional behaviour. The yield criterion, based on the Coulomb friction model, determines when sliding occurs, initiating once the shear stress surpasses a critical value.

== Example ==
C-shape contact problem, which is a benchmark problem for third medium contact involving a void region ($\Omega_v$) and a solid region ($\Omega_s$). The thickness is $t = 0.1 L$, and the region ($\Gamma_D$) has a width of $0.5t$.

The C-shape contact problem used in has established itself as a benchmark problem for third medium contact models. It involves two solid beams, upper and lower, clamped at their left end. The region between the beams is considered "void" and is modelled as a third medium to allow for contact between the beams.

A vertical displacement or load is added to a small region on the upper right edge of the C-shape. The vertical displacement is prescribed such that the upper beam of the C-shape contacts the lower beam of the C-shape. When contact is established, a corner of the upper beam will slide along the lower beam, resulting in severe shear within the third medium. Additionally, the free edge on the right boundary of the third medium is not bounded, leading to severe distortions in the third medium, which are handled by the third medium material model and the applied regularization.

The C-shape problem has also been solved using the frictional TMC model.

Solution of C-shape problem using a conventional Lagrange multiplier approach with Q9 elements (left), TMC with Q4 elements (centre), and TMC with LST elements (right).

== Applications ==
Example of 3D topology optimization with third medium contact. The solids (yellow) are embedded in a third medium.

TMC is widely used in computational mechanics and topology optimization due to its ability to model contact mechanics in a differentiable and fully implicit manner. One of the key advantages of TMC is that it eliminates the need to explicitly define surfaces and contact pairs, thereby simplifying the modelling process.

In topology optimization, TMC ensures that sensitivities are properly handled, enabling gradient-based optimization approaches to converge effectively and produce designs with internal contact. Notable designs achieved through this approach include compliant mechanisms such as hooks, bending mechanisms, and self-contacting springs. The design of metamaterials is a common application for topology optimization, where TMC has expanded the range of possible designs. Additionally, soft springs and pneumatically activated systems, which are useful in the design of soft robots, have been modelled using TMC.

TMC has also been extended to applications involving frictional contact and thermo-mechanical coupling. These advancements enhance the method's utility in modelling real-world mechanical interfaces.

== See also ==
- Contact mechanics
- Hyperelastic materials
- Topology optimization
