= Critical plane analysis =

Analysis of multiaxial stresses and strains

Critical plane analysis refers to the analysis of stresses or strains as they are experienced by a particular plane in a material, as well as the identification of which plane is likely to experience the most extreme damage. Critical plane analysis is widely used in engineering to account for the effects of cyclic, multiaxial load histories on the fatigue life of materials and structures. When a structure is under cyclic multiaxial loading, it is necessary to use multiaxial fatigue criteria that account for the multiaxial loading. If the cyclic multiaxial loading is nonproportional it is mandatory to use a proper multiaxial fatigue criteria. The multiaxial criteria based on the Critical Plane Method are the most effective criteria.

For the plane stress case, the orientation of the plane may be specified by an angle in the plane, and the stresses and strains acting on this plane may be computed via Mohr's circle. For the general 3D case, the orientation may be specified via a unit normal vector of the plane, and the associated stresses strains may be computed via a tensor coordinate transformation law.

Animation showing a series of crack orientations, each of which is evaluated for fatigue life during Critical plane analysis

The chief advantage of critical plane analysis over earlier approaches like Sines rule, or like correlation against maximum principal stress or strain energy density, is the ability to account for damage on specific material planes. This means that cases involving multiple out-of-phase load inputs, or crack closure can be treated with high accuracy. Additionally, critical plane analysis offers the flexibility to adapt to a wide range of materials. Critical plane models for both metals and polymers are widely used.

== History ==
Modern procedures for critical plane analysis trace back to research published in 1973 in which M. W. Brown and K. J. Miller observed that fatigue life under multiaxial conditions is governed by the experience of the plane receiving the most damage, and that both tension and shear loads on the critical plane must be considered.
