= Cauchy stress tensor =

Representation of mechanical stress at every point within a deformed 3D object

- Components of stress in three dimensions
- Common symbols: σ
- SI unit: pascal (Pa)
- Other units: Pound per square inch (psi), bar
- In SI base units: Pa = kg⋅m^{−1}⋅s^{−2}
- Behaviour under coord transformation: tensor
- Dimension: $\mathsf{L}^{-1} \mathsf{M} \mathsf{T}^{-2}$

In continuum mechanics, the Cauchy stress tensor (symbol $\boldsymbol\sigma$, named after Augustin-Louis Cauchy), also called true stress tensor or simply stress tensor, completely defines the state of stress at a point inside a material in the deformed state, placement, or configuration. The second order tensor consists of nine components $\sigma_{ij}$ and relates a unit-length direction vector e to the traction vector T^{(e)} across a surface perpendicular to e:

$\mathbf{T}^{(\mathbf e)} = \mathbf e \cdot\boldsymbol{\sigma}\quad \text{or} \quad T_{j}^{(\mathbf e)}= \sum_{i}\sigma_{ij}e_i.$ (Note: In detail: $$\left[{\begin{matrix} T^{(\mathbf e)}_1 & T^{(\mathbf e)}_2 & T^{(\mathbf e)}_3\end{matrix}}\right]=\left[{\begin{matrix} e_1 & e_2 & e_3 \end{matrix}}\right]\cdot \left[{\begin{matrix} \sigma _{11} & \sigma _{12} & \sigma _{13} \\ \sigma _{21} & \sigma _{22} & \sigma _{23} \\ \sigma _{31} & \sigma _{32} & \sigma _{33} \\ \end{matrix}}\right].$$)

The SI unit of both stress tensor and traction vector is the newton per square metre (N/m^{2}) or pascal (Pa), corresponding to the stress scalar. The unit vector is dimensionless.

The Cauchy stress tensor obeys the tensor transformation law under a change in the system of coordinates. A graphical representation of two-dimensional coordinate transformations is Mohr's circle for stress.

The Cauchy stress tensor is used for stress analysis of material bodies experiencing small deformations: it is a central concept in the linear theory of elasticity. For large deformations, also called finite deformations, other measures of stress are required, such as the Piola–Kirchhoff stress tensor, the Biot stress tensor, and the Kirchhoff stress tensor.

According to the principle of conservation of linear momentum, if the continuum body is in static equilibrium it can be demonstrated that the components of the Cauchy stress tensor in every material point in the body satisfy the equilibrium equations (Cauchy's equations of motion for zero acceleration). At the same time, according to the principle of conservation of angular momentum, equilibrium requires that the summation of moments with respect to an arbitrary point is zero, which leads to the conclusion that the stress tensor is symmetric, thus having only six independent stress components, instead of the original nine. However, in the presence of couple-stresses, i.e. moments per unit volume, the stress tensor is non-symmetric. This also is the case when the Knudsen number is close to one, $K_{n}\rightarrow 1$, or the continuum is a non-Newtonian fluid, which can lead to rotationally non-invariant fluids, such as polymers.

There are certain invariants associated with the stress tensor, whose values do not depend upon the coordinate system chosen, or the area element upon which the stress tensor operates. These are the three eigenvalues of the stress tensor, which are called the principal stresses.

== Euler–Cauchy stress principle – stress vector ==
Figure 2.1a Internal distribution of contact forces and couple stresses on a differential $dS$ of the internal surface $S$ in a continuum, as a result of the interaction between the two portions of the continuum separated by the surface

Figure 2.1b Internal distribution of contact forces and couple stresses on a differential $dS$ of the internal surface $S$ in a continuum, as a result of the interaction between the two portions of the continuum separated by the surface

Figure 2.1c Stress vector on an internal surface S with normal vector n

The Euler–Cauchy stress principle states that upon any surface that divides the body, the action of one part of the body on the other is equivalent (equipollent) to the system of distributed forces and couples on the surface dividing the body, and it is represented by a field $\mathbf{T}^{(\mathbf{n})}$, called the traction vector, defined on the surface $S$ and assumed to depend continuously on the surface's normal unit vector $\mathbf n$.

To formulate the Euler–Cauchy stress principle, consider a surface $S$ passing through an internal material point $P$ dividing the continuous body into two segments, as seen in Figure 2.1a or 2.1b (one may use either the cutting plane diagram or the diagram with the arbitrary volume inside the continuum enclosed by the surface $S$).

Following the classical dynamics of Newton and Euler, the motion of a material body is produced by the action of externally applied forces which are assumed to be of two kinds: surface forces $\mathbf F$ and body forces $\mathbf b$. Thus, the total force $\mathcal F$ applied to a body or to a portion of the body can be expressed as:

$$\mathcal F = \mathbf b + \mathbf F$$

Only surface forces will be discussed in this article as they are relevant to the Cauchy stress tensor.

When the body is subjected to external surface forces or contact forces $\mathbf F$, following Euler's equations of motion, internal contact forces and moments are transmitted from point to point in the body, and from one segment to the other through the dividing surface $S$, due to the mechanical contact of one portion of the continuum onto the other (Figure 2.1a and 2.1b). On an element of area $\Delta S$ containing $P$, with normal vector $\mathbf n$, the force distribution is equipollent to a contact force $\Delta \mathbf F$ exerted at point $P$ and surface moment $\Delta \mathbf M$. In particular, the contact force is given by

$$\Delta\mathbf F= \mathbf T^{(\mathbf n)}\,\Delta S ,$$

where $\mathbf T^{(\mathbf n)}$ is the mean surface traction.

Cauchy's stress principle asserts that as $\Delta S$ tends to zero the ratio $\Delta \mathbf F/\Delta S$ becomes $d\mathbf F/dS$ and the couple stress vector $\Delta \mathbf M$ vanishes. In specific fields of continuum mechanics the couple stress is assumed not to vanish; however, classical branches of continuum mechanics address non-polar materials which do not consider couple stresses and body moments.

The resultant vector $d\mathbf F/dS$ is defined as the surface traction, also called stress vector, traction, or traction vector. given by $\mathbf{T}^{(\mathbf{n})}=T_i^{(\mathbf{n})}\mathbf{e}_i$ at the point $P$ associated with a plane with a normal vector $\mathbf n$:

$$T^{(\mathbf{n})}_i= \lim_{\Delta S \to 0} \frac {\Delta F_i}{\Delta S} = {dF_i \over dS}.$$

This equation means that the stress vector depends on its location in the body and the orientation of the plane on which it is acting.

This implies that the balancing action of internal contact forces generates a contact force density or Cauchy traction field $\mathbf T(\mathbf n, \mathbf x, t)$ that represents a distribution of internal contact forces throughout the volume of the body in a particular configuration of the body at a given time $t$. It is not a vector field because it depends not only on the position $\mathbf x$ of a particular material point, but also on the local orientation of the surface element as defined by its normal vector $\mathbf n$.

Depending on the orientation of the plane under consideration, the stress vector may not necessarily be perpendicular to that plane, i.e. parallel to $\mathbf n$, and can be resolved into two components (Figure 2.1c):

- one normal to the plane, called normal stress
  $$\mathbf{\sigma_\mathrm{n}}= \lim_{\Delta S \to 0} \frac {\Delta F_\mathrm n}{\Delta S} = \frac{dF_\mathrm n}{dS},$$

where $dF_\mathrm n$ is the normal component of the force $d\mathbf F$ to the differential area $dS$

- and the other parallel to this plane, called the shear stress
  $$\mathbf \tau= \lim_{\Delta S \to 0} \frac {\Delta F_\mathrm s}{\Delta S} = \frac{dF_\mathrm s}{dS},$$

where $dF_\mathrm s$ is the tangential component of the force $d\mathbf F$ to the differential surface area $dS$. The shear stress can be further decomposed into two mutually perpendicular vectors.

=== Cauchy's postulate ===
According to the Cauchy Postulate, the stress vector $\mathbf{T}^{(\mathbf{n})}$ remains unchanged for all surfaces passing through the point $P$ and having the same normal vector $\mathbf n$ at $P$, i.e., having a common tangent at $P$. This means that the stress vector is a function of the normal vector $\mathbf n$ only, and is not influenced by the curvature of the internal surfaces.

=== Cauchy's fundamental lemma ===
A consequence of Cauchy's postulate is Cauchy's Fundamental Lemma, also called the Cauchy reciprocal theorem, which states that the stress vectors acting on opposite sides of the same surface are equal in magnitude and opposite in direction. Cauchy's fundamental lemma is equivalent to Newton's third law of motion of action and reaction, and is expressed as

$$- \mathbf{T}^{(\mathbf{n})}= \mathbf{T}^{(- \mathbf{n})}.$$

== Cauchy's stress theorem—stress tensor ==
The state of stress at a point in the body is then defined by all the stress vectors T^{(n)} associated with all planes (infinite in number) that pass through that point. However, according to Cauchy's fundamental theorem, also called Cauchy's stress theorem, merely by knowing the stress vectors on three mutually perpendicular planes, the stress vector on any other plane passing through that point can be found through coordinate transformation equations.

Cauchy's stress theorem states that there exists a second-order tensor field σ(x, t), called the Cauchy stress tensor, independent of n, such that T is a linear function of n:

$$\mathbf{T}^{(\mathbf n)}= \mathbf n \cdot\boldsymbol{\sigma}\quad \text{or} \quad T_j^{(\mathbf n)}= \sigma_{ij}n_i.$$

This equation implies that the stress vector T^{(n)} at any point P in a continuum associated with a plane with normal unit vector n can be expressed as a function of the stress vectors on the planes perpendicular to the coordinate axes, i.e. in terms of the components σ_{ij} of the stress tensor σ.

To prove this expression, consider a tetrahedron with three faces oriented in the coordinate planes, and with an infinitesimal area dA oriented in an arbitrary direction specified by a normal unit vector n (Figure 2.2). The tetrahedron is formed by slicing the infinitesimal element along an arbitrary plane with unit normal n. The stress vector on this plane is denoted by T^{(n)}. The stress vectors acting on the faces of the tetrahedron are denoted as T^{(e_{1})}, T^{(e_{2})}, and T^{(e_{3})}, and are by definition the components σ_{ij} of the stress tensor σ. This tetrahedron is sometimes called the Cauchy tetrahedron. The equilibrium of forces, i.e. Euler's first law of motion (Newton's second law of motion), gives:

$$\mathbf{T}^{(\mathbf{n})} \, dA - \mathbf{T}^{(\mathbf{e}_1)} \, dA_1 - \mathbf{T}^{(\mathbf{e}_2)} \, dA_2 - \mathbf{T}^{(\mathbf{e}_3)} \, dA_3 = \rho \left( \frac{h}{3}dA \right) \mathbf{a},$$

Figure 2.2. Stress vector acting on a plane with normal unit vector n. A note on the sign convention: The tetrahedron is formed by slicing a parallelepiped along an arbitrary plane n. So, the force acting on the plane n is the reaction exerted by the other half of the parallelepiped and has an opposite sign.

where the right-hand-side represents the product of the mass enclosed by the tetrahedron and its acceleration: ρ is the density, a is the acceleration, and h is the height of the tetrahedron, considering the plane n as the base. The area of the faces of the tetrahedron perpendicular to the axes can be found by projecting dA into each face (using the dot product):

$$dA_1= \left(\mathbf{n} \cdot \mathbf{e}_1 \right)dA = n_1 \; dA,$$
$$dA_2= \left(\mathbf{n} \cdot \mathbf{e}_2 \right)dA = n_2 \; dA,$$
$$dA_3= \left(\mathbf{n} \cdot \mathbf{e}_3 \right)dA = n_3 \; dA,$$

and then substituting into the equation to cancel out dA:

$$\mathbf{T}^{(\mathbf{n})} - \mathbf{T}^{(\mathbf{e}_1)}n_1 - \mathbf{T}^{(\mathbf{e}_2)}n_2 - \mathbf{T}^{(\mathbf{e}_3)}n_3 = \rho \left( \frac{h}{3} \right) \mathbf{a}.$$

To consider the limiting case as the tetrahedron shrinks to a point, h must go to 0 (intuitively, the plane n is translated along n toward O). As a result, the right-hand-side of the equation approaches 0, so

$$\mathbf{T}^{(\mathbf{n})} = \mathbf{T}^{(\mathbf{e}_1)} n_1 + \mathbf{T}^{(\mathbf{e}_2)} n_2 + \mathbf{T}^{(\mathbf{e}_3)} n_3.$$

Assuming a material element (see figure at the top of the page) with planes perpendicular to the coordinate axes of a Cartesian coordinate system, the stress vectors associated with each of the element planes, i.e. T^{(e_{1})}, T^{(e_{2})}, and T^{(e_{3})} can be decomposed into a normal component and two shear components, i.e. components in the direction of the three coordinate axes. For the particular case of a surface with normal unit vector oriented in the direction of the x_{1}-axis, denote the normal stress by σ_{11}, and the two shear stresses as σ_{12} and σ_{13}:

$$\mathbf{T}^{(\mathbf{e}_1)}= T_1^{(\mathbf{e}_1)}\mathbf{e}_1 + T_2^{(\mathbf{e}_1)} \mathbf{e}_2 + T_3^{(\mathbf{e}_1)} \mathbf{e}_3 = \sigma_{11} \mathbf{e}_1 + \sigma_{12} \mathbf{e}_2 + \sigma_{13} \mathbf{e}_3,$$
$$\mathbf{T}^{(\mathbf{e}_2)}= T_1^{(\mathbf{e}_2)}\mathbf{e}_1 + T_2^{(\mathbf{e}_2)} \mathbf{e}_2 + T_3^{(\mathbf{e}_2)} \mathbf{e}_3=\sigma_{21} \mathbf{e}_1 + \sigma_{22} \mathbf{e}_2 + \sigma_{23} \mathbf{e}_3,$$
$$\mathbf{T}^{(\mathbf{e}_3)}= T_1^{(\mathbf{e}_3)}\mathbf{e}_1 + T_2^{(\mathbf{e}_3)} \mathbf{e}_2 + T_3^{(\mathbf{e}_3)} \mathbf{e}_3=\sigma_{31} \mathbf{e}_1 + \sigma_{32} \mathbf{e}_2 + \sigma_{33} \mathbf{e}_3,$$

In index notation this is

$$\mathbf{T}^{(\mathbf{e}_i)}= T_j^{(\mathbf{e}_i)} \mathbf{e}_j = \sigma_{ij} \mathbf{e}_j.$$

The nine components σ_{ij} of the stress vectors are the components of a second-order Cartesian tensor called the Cauchy stress tensor, which can be used to completely define the state of stress at a point and is given by

$$\boldsymbol{\sigma}= \sigma_{ij} = \left[{\begin{matrix} \mathbf{T}^{(\mathbf{e}_1)} \\
\mathbf{T}^{(\mathbf{e}_2)} \\
\mathbf{T}^{(\mathbf{e}_3)} \\
\end{matrix}}\right] =
\left[{\begin{matrix}
\sigma _{11} & \sigma _{12} & \sigma _{13} \\
\sigma _{21} & \sigma _{22} & \sigma _{23} \\
\sigma _{31} & \sigma _{32} & \sigma _{33} \\
\end{matrix}}\right] \equiv \left[{\begin{matrix}
\sigma _{xx} & \sigma _{xy} & \sigma _{xz} \\
\sigma _{yx} & \sigma _{yy} & \sigma _{yz} \\
\sigma _{zx} & \sigma _{zy} & \sigma _{zz} \\
\end{matrix}}\right] \equiv \left[{\begin{matrix}
\sigma _x & \tau _{xy} & \tau _{xz} \\
\tau _{yx} & \sigma _y & \tau _{yz} \\
\tau _{zx} & \tau _{zy} & \sigma _z \\
\end{matrix}}\right],$$

where σ_{11}, σ_{22}, and σ_{33} are normal stresses, and σ_{12}, σ_{13}, σ_{21}, σ_{23}, σ_{31}, and σ_{32} are shear stresses. The first index i indicates that the stress acts on a plane normal to the X_{i} -axis, and the second index j denotes the direction in which the stress acts (for example, σ_{12} implies that the stress is acting on the plane that is normal to the 1st axis i.e., X_{1}, and acts along the 2nd axis i.e., X_{2}). A stress component is positive if it acts in the positive direction of the coordinate axes, and if the plane where it acts has an outward normal vector pointing in the positive coordinate direction.

Thus, using the components of the stress tensor

$$\begin{align} \mathbf{T}^{(\mathbf{n})} &= \mathbf{T}^{(\mathbf{e}_1)}n_1 + \mathbf{T}^{(\mathbf{e}_2)}n_2 + \mathbf{T}^{(\mathbf{e}_3)}n_3 \\
& = \sum_{i=1}^3 \mathbf{T}^{(\mathbf{e}_i)}n_i \\
&= \left( \sigma_{ij}\mathbf{e}_j \right)n_i \\
&= \sigma_{ij}n_i\mathbf{e}_j
\end{align}$$

or, equivalently,

$$T_j^{(\mathbf n)}= \sigma_{ij}n_i.$$

Alternatively, in matrix form we have

$$\left[{\begin{matrix}
T^{(\mathbf n)}_1 & T^{(\mathbf n)}_2 & T^{(\mathbf n)}_3\end{matrix}}\right]=\left[{\begin{matrix}
n_1 & n_2 & n_3
\end{matrix}}\right]\cdot
\left[{\begin{matrix}
\sigma _{11} & \sigma _{12} & \sigma _{13} \\
\sigma _{21} & \sigma _{22} & \sigma _{23} \\
\sigma _{31} & \sigma _{32} & \sigma _{33} \\
\end{matrix}}\right].$$

The Voigt notation representation of the Cauchy stress tensor takes advantage of the symmetry of the stress tensor to express the stress as a six-dimensional vector of the form:

$$\boldsymbol{\sigma} = \begin{bmatrix}\sigma_1 & \sigma_2 & \sigma_3 & \sigma_4 & \sigma_5 & \sigma_6 \end{bmatrix}^\textsf{T} \equiv \begin{bmatrix}\sigma_{11} & \sigma_{22} & \sigma_{33} & \sigma_{23} & \sigma_{13} & \sigma_{12} \end{bmatrix}^\textsf{T}.$$

The Voigt notation is used extensively in representing stress–strain relations in solid mechanics and for computational efficiency in numerical structural mechanics software.

=== Transformation rule of the stress tensor ===
It can be shown that the stress tensor is a contravariant second order tensor, which is a statement of how it transforms under a change of the coordinate system. From an x_{i}-system to an x_{i}' -system, the components σ_{ij} in the initial system are transformed into the components σ_{ij}′ in the new system according to the tensor transformation rule (Figure 2.4):

$$\sigma'_{ij} = a_{im}a_{jn}\sigma_{mn} \quad \text{or} \quad \boldsymbol{\sigma}' = \mathbf A \boldsymbol{\sigma} \mathbf A^\textsf{T},$$

where A is a rotation matrix with components a_{ij}. In matrix form this is

$$\left[{\begin{matrix}
\sigma'_{11} & \sigma'_{12} & \sigma'_{13} \\
\sigma'_{21} & \sigma'_{22} & \sigma'_{23} \\
\sigma'_{31} & \sigma'_{32} & \sigma'_{33} \\
\end{matrix}}\right]=\left[{\begin{matrix}
a_{11} & a_{12} & a_{13} \\
a_{21} & a_{22} & a_{23} \\
a_{31} & a_{32} & a_{33} \\
\end{matrix}}\right]\left[{\begin{matrix}
\sigma_{11} & \sigma_{12} & \sigma_{13} \\
\sigma_{21} & \sigma_{22} & \sigma_{23} \\
\sigma_{31} & \sigma_{32} & \sigma_{33} \\
\end{matrix}}\right]\left[{\begin{matrix}
a_{11} & a_{21} & a_{31} \\
a_{12} & a_{22} & a_{32} \\
a_{13} & a_{23} & a_{33} \\
\end{matrix}}\right].$$

Figure 2.4 Transformation of the stress tensor

Expanding the matrix operation, and simplifying terms using the symmetry of the stress tensor, gives

$$\begin{align}
\sigma_{11}' ={} &a_{11}^2\sigma_{11}+a_{12}^2\sigma_{22}+a_{13}^2\sigma_{33}+2a_{11}a_{12}\sigma_{12}+2a_{11}a_{13}\sigma_{13}+2a_{12}a_{13}\sigma_{23}, \\
\sigma_{22}' ={} &a_{21}^2\sigma_{11}+a_{22}^2\sigma_{22}+a_{23}^2\sigma_{33}+2a_{21}a_{22}\sigma_{12}+2a_{21}a_{23}\sigma_{13}+2a_{22}a_{23}\sigma_{23}, \\
\sigma_{33}' ={} &a_{31}^2\sigma_{11}+a_{32}^2\sigma_{22}+a_{33}^2\sigma_{33}+2a_{31}a_{32}\sigma_{12}+2a_{31}a_{33}\sigma_{13}+2a_{32}a_{33}\sigma_{23}, \\
\sigma_{12}' ={}
&a_{11}a_{21}\sigma_{11}+a_{12}a_{22}\sigma_{22}+a_{13}a_{23}\sigma_{33} \\
&+(a_{11}a_{22}+a_{12}a_{21})\sigma_{12}+(a_{12}a_{23}+a_{13}a_{22})\sigma_{23}+(a_{11}a_{23}+a_{13}a_{21})\sigma_{13}, \\
\sigma_{23}' ={}
&a_{21}a_{31}\sigma_{11}+a_{22}a_{32}\sigma_{22}+a_{23}a_{33}\sigma_{33} \\
&+(a_{21}a_{32}+a_{22}a_{31})\sigma_{12}+(a_{22}a_{33}+a_{23}a_{32})\sigma_{23}+(a_{21}a_{33}+a_{23}a_{31})\sigma_{13}, \\
\sigma_{13}' ={}
&a_{11}a_{31}\sigma_{11}+a_{12}a_{32}\sigma_{22}+a_{13}a_{33}\sigma_{33} \\
&+(a_{11}a_{32}+a_{12}a_{31})\sigma_{12}+(a_{12}a_{33}+a_{13}a_{32})\sigma_{23}+(a_{11}a_{33}+a_{13}a_{31})\sigma_{13}.
\end{align}$$

The Mohr circle for stress is a graphical representation of this transformation of stresses.

=== Normal and shear stresses ===
The magnitude of the normal stress component σ_{n} of any stress vector T^{(n)} acting on an arbitrary plane with normal unit vector n at a given point, in terms of the components σ_{ij} of the stress tensor σ, is the dot product of the stress vector and the normal unit vector:

$$\begin{align}
\sigma_\mathrm{n} &= \mathbf{T}^{(\mathbf{n})}\cdot \mathbf{n} \\
&=T^{(\mathbf n)}_i n_i \\
&=\sigma_{ij}n_i n_j.
\end{align}$$

The magnitude of the shear stress component τ_{n}, acting orthogonal to the vector n, can then be found using the Pythagorean theorem:

$$\begin{align}
\tau_\mathrm{n} &=\sqrt{ \left( T^{(\mathbf n)} \right)^2-\sigma_\mathrm{n}^2} \\
&= \sqrt{T_i^{(\mathbf n)}T_i^{(\mathbf n)}-\sigma_\mathrm{n}^2},
\end{align}$$

where

$$\left( T^{(\mathbf n)} \right)^2 = T_i^{(\mathbf n)} T_i^{(\mathbf n)} = \left( \sigma_{ij} n_j \right) \left(\sigma_{ik} n_k \right) = \sigma_{ij} \sigma_{ik} n_j n_k.$$

== Balance laws – Cauchy's equations of motion ==
Figure 4. Continuum body in equilibrium

=== Cauchy's first law of motion ===
According to the principle of conservation of linear momentum, if the continuum body is in static equilibrium it can be demonstrated that the components of the Cauchy stress tensor in every material point in the body satisfy the equilibrium equations:

$$\sigma_{ji,j}+ F_i = 0 ,$$

where $\sigma_{ji,j} = \sum_j \partial_j \sigma_{ji}$

For example, for a hydrostatic fluid in equilibrium conditions, the stress tensor takes on the form:

$${\sigma_{ij}} = -p{\delta_{ij}} ,$$

where $p$ is the hydrostatic pressure, and ${\delta_{ij}}\$ is the Kronecker delta.

Derivation of equilibrium equations
Consider a continuum body (see Figure 4) occupying a volume $V$, having a surface area $S$, with defined traction or surface forces $T_i^{(n)}$ per unit area acting on every point of the body surface, and body forces $F_i$ per unit of volume on every point within the volume $V$. Thus, if the body is in equilibrium the resultant force acting on the volume is zero, thus:

$$\int_S T_i^{(n)}dS + \int_V F_i dV = 0$$

By definition the stress vector is $T_i^{(n)} =\sigma_{ji}n_j$, then

$$\int_S \sigma_{ji}n_j\, dS + \int_V F_i\, dV = 0$$

Using the Gauss's divergence theorem to convert a surface integral to a volume integral gives

$$\int_V \sigma_{ji,j}\, dV + \int_V F_i\, dV = 0$$
$$\int_V (\sigma_{ji,j} + F_i\,) dV = 0$$

For an arbitrary volume the integral vanishes, and we have the equilibrium equations

$$\sigma_{ji,j} + F_i = 0$$

=== Cauchy's second law of motion ===
According to the principle of conservation of angular momentum, equilibrium requires that the summation of moments with respect to an arbitrary point is zero, which leads to the conclusion that the stress tensor is symmetric, thus having only six independent stress components, instead of the original nine:

$$\sigma_{ij}=\sigma_{ji}$$

Derivation of symmetry of the stress tensor
Summing moments about point O (Figure 4) the resultant moment is zero as the body is in equilibrium. Thus,

$$\begin{align}
M_O &=\int_S (\mathbf{r}\times\mathbf{T})dS + \int_V (\mathbf{r}\times\mathbf{F})dV=0 \\
0 &= \int_S\varepsilon_{ijk}x_jT_k^{(n)}dS + \int_V\varepsilon_{ijk}x_jF_k dV \\
\end{align}$$

where $\mathbf{r}$ is the position vector and is expressed as

$$\mathbf{r}=x_j\mathbf{e}_j$$

and $\varepsilon_{ijk}$ is the Levi-Civita symbol.

Knowing that $T_k^{(n)} =\sigma_{mk}n_m$ and using Gauss's divergence theorem to change from a surface integral to a volume integral, we have

$$\begin{align}
0 &= \int_S \varepsilon_{ijk}x_j\sigma_{mk}n_m\, dS + \int_V\varepsilon_{ijk}x_jF_k\, dV \\
&= \int_V (\varepsilon_{ijk}x_j\sigma_{mk})_{,m} dV + \int_V\varepsilon_{ijk}x_jF_k\, dV \\
&= \int_V (\varepsilon_{ijk}x_{j,m}\sigma_{mk}+\varepsilon_{ijk}x_j\sigma_{mk,m}) dV + \int_V\varepsilon_{ijk}x_jF_k\, dV \\
&= \int_V (\varepsilon_{ijk}x_{j,m}\sigma_{mk}) dV+ \int_V \varepsilon_{ijk}x_j(\sigma_{mk,m}+F_k)dV \\
\end{align}$$

The second integral is zero as it contains the equilibrium equations. This leaves the first integral, where $x_{j,m}=\delta_{jm}$, therefore

$$\int_V (\varepsilon_{ijk}\sigma_{jk}) dV=0$$

For an arbitrary volume V, we then have

$$\varepsilon_{ijk}\sigma_{jk}=0,$$

which is satisfied at every point within the body. Expanding this equation we have

$\sigma_{12}=\sigma_{21}$, $\sigma_{23}=\sigma_{32}$, and $\sigma_{13}=\sigma_{31}$

or in general

$$\sigma_{ij}=\sigma_{ji}$$

This proves that the stress tensor is symmetric

However, in the presence of couple-stresses, i.e. moments per unit volume, the stress tensor is non-symmetric. This also is the case when the Knudsen number is close to one, $K_{n}\rightarrow 1$, or the continuum is a non-Newtonian fluid, which can lead to rotationally non-invariant fluids, such as polymers.

== Principal stresses and stress invariants ==
Stress components on a 2D rotating element. Example of how stress components vary on the faces (edges) of a rectangular element as the angle of its orientation is varied. Principal stresses occur when the shear stresses simultaneously disappear from all faces. The orientation at which this occurs gives the principal directions. In this example, when the rectangle is horizontal, the stresses are given by $\left[{\begin{smallmatrix} \sigma_{11} & \sigma_{12}\\ \sigma_{21} & \sigma_{22} \end{smallmatrix}}\right] = \left[\begin{smallmatrix} -10 & 10\\ 10 & 15\end{smallmatrix}\right].$

At every point in a stressed body there are at least three planes, called principal planes, with normal vectors $\mathbf{n}$, called principal directions, where the corresponding stress vector is perpendicular to the plane, i.e., parallel or in the same direction as the normal vector $\mathbf{n}$, and where there are no normal shear stresses $\tau_\mathrm{n}$. The three stresses normal to these principal planes are called principal stresses.

The components $\sigma_{ij}$ of the stress tensor depend on the orientation of the coordinate system at the point under consideration. However, the stress tensor itself is a physical quantity and as such, it is independent of the coordinate system chosen to represent it. There are certain invariants associated with every tensor which are also independent of the coordinate system. For example, a vector is a simple tensor of rank one. In three dimensions, it has three components. The value of these components will depend on the coordinate system chosen to represent the vector, but the magnitude of the vector is a physical quantity (a scalar) and is independent of the Cartesian coordinate system chosen to represent the vector (so long as it is normal). Similarly, every second rank tensor (such as the stress and the strain tensors) has three independent invariant quantities associated with it. One set of such invariants are the principal stresses of the stress tensor, which are just the eigenvalues of the stress tensor. Their direction vectors are the principal directions or eigenvectors.

A stress vector parallel to the normal unit vector $\mathbf{n}$ is given by:

$$\mathbf{T}^{(\mathbf{n})} = \lambda \mathbf{n}= \mathbf{\sigma}_\mathrm n \mathbf{n} ,$$

where $\lambda$ is a constant of proportionality, and in this particular case corresponds to the magnitudes $\sigma_\mathrm{n}$ of the normal stress vectors or principal stresses.

Knowing that $T_i^{(n)}=\sigma_{ij}n_j$ and ${{{1}}}$, we have

$$\begin{align}
T_i^{(n)} &= \lambda n_i \\
\sigma_{ij}n_j &= \lambda n_i \\
\sigma_{ij}n_j - \lambda n_i &= 0 \\
\left(\sigma_{ij} - \lambda\delta_{ij}\right)n_j &=0 \\
\end{align}$$

This is a homogeneous system, i.e. equal to zero, of three linear equations where $n_j$ are the unknowns. To obtain a nontrivial (non-zero) solution for $n_j$, the matrix determinant of the coefficients must be equal to zero, i.e. the system is singular. Thus,

$$\left|\sigma_{ij} - \lambda\delta_{ij}\right| =
\begin{vmatrix}
\sigma_{11} - \lambda & \sigma_{12} & \sigma_{13} \\
\sigma_{21} & \sigma_{22} - \lambda & \sigma_{23} \\
\sigma_{31} & \sigma_{32} & \sigma_{33} - \lambda \\
\end{vmatrix} = 0$$

Expanding the determinant leads to the characteristic equation

$$\left|\sigma_{ij}- \lambda\delta_{ij}\right| = -\lambda^3 + I_1\lambda^2 - I_2\lambda + I_3 = 0$$

where

$$\begin{align}
I_1 &= \sigma_{11} + \sigma_{22} + \sigma_{33} \\
&= \sigma_{kk} = \text{tr}(\boldsymbol{\sigma}) \\[4pt]
I_2 &= \begin{vmatrix}
\sigma_{22} & \sigma_{23} \\
\sigma_{32} & \sigma_{33} \\
\end{vmatrix} + \begin{vmatrix}
\sigma_{11} & \sigma_{13} \\
\sigma_{31} & \sigma_{33} \\
\end{vmatrix} + \begin{vmatrix}
\sigma_{11} & \sigma_{12} \\
\sigma_{21} & \sigma_{22} \\
\end{vmatrix} \\
&= \sigma_{11}\sigma_{22} + \sigma_{22}\sigma_{33} + \sigma_{11}\sigma_{33} - \sigma_{12}^2 - \sigma_{23}^2 - \sigma_{31}^2 \\
&= \frac{1}{2}\left(\sigma_{ii}\sigma_{jj} - \sigma_{ij}\sigma_{ji}\right)
= \frac{1}{2}\left[ \left( \text{tr}(\boldsymbol{\sigma}) \right)^{2} - \text{tr}\left(\boldsymbol{\sigma}^{2}\right) \right] \\[4pt]
I_3 &= \det(\sigma_{ij}) = \det(\boldsymbol{\sigma})\\
&= \sigma_{11}\sigma_{22}\sigma_{33} + 2\sigma_{12}\sigma_{23}\sigma_{31} - \sigma_{12}^2\sigma_{33} - \sigma_{23}^2\sigma_{11} - \sigma_{31}^2\sigma_{22} \\
\end{align}$$

The characteristic equation has three real roots $\lambda_i$ (i.e. with a zero imaginary component) due to the stress tensor being symmetric. The $\sigma_1 = \max \left( \lambda_1,\lambda_2,\lambda_3 \right)$, $\sigma_3 = \min \left(\lambda_1, \lambda_2, \lambda_3\right)$ and $\sigma_2 = I_1 - \sigma_1 - \sigma_3$, are the principal stresses, functions of the eigenvalues $\lambda_i$. The eigenvalues are the roots of the characteristic polynomial. The principal stresses are unique for a given stress tensor. Therefore, from the characteristic equation, the coefficients $I_1$, $I_2$ and $I_3$, called the first, second, and third stress invariants, respectively, always have the same value regardless of the coordinate system's orientation.

For each eigenvalue, there is a non-trivial solution for $n_j$ in the equation $\left(\sigma_{ij} - \lambda\delta_{ij} \right)n_j = 0$. These solutions are the principal directions or eigenvectors defining the plane where the principal stresses act. The principal stresses and principal directions characterize the stress at a point and are independent of the orientation.

A coordinate system with axes oriented to the principal directions implies that the normal stresses are the principal stresses and the stress tensor is represented by a diagonal matrix:

$$\sigma_{ij} =
\begin{bmatrix}
\sigma_1 & 0 & 0\\
0 & \sigma_2 & 0\\
0 & 0 & \sigma_3
\end{bmatrix}$$

The principal stresses can be combined to form the stress invariants, $I_1$, $I_2$, and $I_3$. The first and third invariant are the trace and determinant respectively, of the stress tensor. Thus,

$$\begin{align}
I_1 &= \sigma_{1} + \sigma_{2} + \sigma_{3} \\
I_2 &= \sigma_{1}\sigma_{2} + \sigma_{2}\sigma_{3} + \sigma_{3}\sigma_{1} \\
I_3 &= \sigma_{1}\sigma_{2}\sigma_{3} \\
\end{align}$$

Because of its simplicity, the principal coordinate system is often useful when considering the state of the elastic medium at a particular point. Principal stresses are often expressed in the following equation for evaluating stresses in the x and y directions or axial and bending stresses on a part. The principal normal stresses can then be used to calculate the von Mises stress and ultimately the safety factor and margin of safety.

$$\sigma_{1}, \sigma_{2} = \frac{\sigma_{x} + \sigma_{y}}{2} \pm \sqrt{\left(\frac{\sigma_{x} - \sigma_{y}}{2}\right)^2 + \tau_{xy}^2} .$$

Using just the part of the equation under the square root is equal to the maximum and minimum shear stress for plus and minus. This is shown as:

$$\tau_\max,\tau_\min = \pm \sqrt{\left(\frac{\sigma_{x} - \sigma_{y}}{2}\right)^2 + \tau_{xy}^2} .$$

== Maximum and minimum shear stresses ==
The maximum shear stress or maximum principal shear stress is equal to one-half the difference between the largest and smallest principal stresses, and acts on the plane that bisects the angle between the directions of the largest and smallest principal stresses, i.e. the plane of the maximum shear stress is oriented $45^\circ$ from the principal stress planes. The maximum shear stress is expressed as

$$\tau_\max = \frac{1}{2}\left|\sigma_\max - \sigma_\min\right| .$$

Assuming $\sigma_1 \ge \sigma_2 \ge \sigma_3$ then

$$\tau_\max = \frac{1}{2}\left|\sigma_1 - \sigma_3\right|$$

When the stress tensor is non-zero the normal stress component acting on the plane for the maximum shear stress is non-zero and it is equal to

$$\sigma_\text{n} = \frac{1}{2}\left(\sigma_1 + \sigma_3\right) .$$

Derivation of the maximum and minimum shear stresses
The normal stress can be written in terms of principal stresses $(\sigma_1\ge\sigma_2\ge\sigma_3)$ as

$$\begin{align}
\sigma_\mathrm{n}
&= \sigma_{ij}n_in_j \\
&= \sigma_1n_1^2 + \sigma_2n_2^2 + \sigma_3n_3^2\\
\end{align}$$

Knowing that $\left( T^{(n)} \right)^2=\sigma_{ij}\sigma_{ik}n_jn_k$, the shear stress in terms of principal stresses components is expressed as

$$\begin{align}
\tau_\text{n}^2
&= \left( T^{(n)} \right)^2-\sigma_\text{n}^2 \\
&= \sigma_1^2n_1^2+\sigma_2^2n_2^2+\sigma_3^2n_3^2-\left(\sigma_1n_1^2+\sigma_2n_2^2+\sigma_3n_3^2\right)^2 \\
&= \left(\sigma_1^2 - \sigma_2^2\right)n_1^2 + \left(\sigma_2^2 - \sigma_3^2\right)n_2^2 + \sigma_3^2 - \left[\left(\sigma_1 - \sigma_3\right)n_1^2 + \left(\sigma_2 - \sigma_3\right)n_2^2 + \sigma_3\right]^2 \\
&= (\sigma_1 - \sigma_2)^2 n_1^2 n_2^2 + (\sigma_2 - \sigma_3)^2 n_2^2 n_3^2 + (\sigma_1 - \sigma_3)^2 n_1^2 n_3^2 \\
\end{align}$$

The maximum shear stress at a point in a continuum body is determined by maximizing $\tau_\mathrm{n}^2$ subject to the condition that

$$n_i n_i = n_1^2 + n_2^2 + n_3^2 = 1 .$$

This is a constrained maximization problem, which can be solved using the Lagrangian multiplier technique to convert the problem into an unconstrained optimization problem. Thus, the stationary values (maximum and minimum values)of $\tau_\text{n}^2$ occur where the gradient of $\tau_\text{n}^2$ is parallel to the gradient of $F$.

The Lagrangian function for this problem can be written as

$$\begin{align}
F\left(n_1,n_2,n_3,\lambda\right)
&= \tau^2 + \lambda \left(g\left(n_1,n_2,n_3\right) - 1 \right) \\
&= \sigma_1^2n_1^2+\sigma_2^2n_2^2+\sigma_3^2n_3^2-\left(\sigma_1n_1^2+\sigma_2n_2^2+\sigma_3n_3^2\right)^2+\lambda\left(n_1^2+n_2^2+n_3^2-1\right)\\
\end{align}$$

where $\lambda$ is the Lagrangian multiplier (which is different from the $\lambda$ use to denote eigenvalues).

The extreme values of these functions are

$$\frac{\partial F}{\partial n_1} = 0 \qquad \frac{\partial F}{\partial n_2} = 0 \qquad \frac{\partial F}{\partial n_3} = 0$$

thence

$$\frac{\partial F}{\partial n_1} = n_1\sigma_1^2-2n_1\sigma_1\left(\sigma_1 n_1^2+\sigma_2 n_2^2+\sigma_3 n_3^2\right)+\lambda n_1 = 0$$
$$\frac{\partial F}{\partial n_2} = n_2\sigma_2^2-2n_2\sigma_2\left(\sigma_1 n_1^2+\sigma_2 n_2^2+\sigma_3 n_3^2\right)+\lambda n_2 = 0$$
$$\frac{\partial F}{\partial n_3} = n_3\sigma_3^2-2n_3\sigma_3\left(\sigma_1 n_1^2+\sigma_2 n_2^2+\sigma_3 n_3^2\right)+\lambda n_3 = 0$$

These three equations together with the condition $n_i n_i = 1$ may be solved for $\lambda$, $n_1$, $n_2$, and $n_3$.

By multiplying the first three equations by $n_1$, $n_2$, and $n_3$, respectively, and knowing that $\sigma_\text{n} = \sigma_{ij}n_i n_j = \sigma_1n_1^2 + \sigma_2n_2^2 + \sigma_3 n_3^2$ we obtain

$$n_1^2\sigma_1^2 - 2\sigma_1 n_1^2\sigma_\text{n} + n_1^2\lambda = 0$$
$$n_2^2\sigma_2^2 - 2\sigma_2 n_2^2\sigma_\text{n} + n_2^2\lambda = 0$$
$$n_3^2\sigma_3^2 - 2\sigma_1 n_3^2\sigma_\text{n} + n_3^2\lambda = 0$$

Adding these three equations we get

$$\begin{align}
\left[n_1^2\sigma_1^2+n_2^2\sigma_2^2+n_3^2\sigma_3^2\right] - 2\left(\sigma_1n_1^2+\sigma_2n_2^2+\sigma_3n_3^2\right)\sigma_\mathrm{n} + \lambda\left(n_1^2+n_2^2+n_3^2\right) &= 0 \\
\left[\tau_\mathrm{n}^2+\left(\sigma_1n_1^2+\sigma_2n_2^2+\sigma_3n_3^2\right)^2\right] - 2\sigma_\mathrm{n}^2 + \lambda& = 0 \\
\left[\tau_\mathrm{n}^2+\sigma_\mathrm{n}^2\right] - 2\sigma_\mathrm{n}^2 + \lambda &= 0 \\
\lambda &= \sigma_\mathrm{n}^2 - \tau_\mathrm{n}^2
\end{align}$$

This result can be substituted into each of the first three equations to obtain

$$\begin{align}
\frac{\partial F}{\partial n_1} = n_1\sigma_1^2 - 2n_1\sigma_1\left(\sigma_1 n_1^2 + \sigma_2 n_2^2 + \sigma_3 n_3^2\right) + \left(\sigma_\text{n}^2 - \tau_\text{n}^2\right) n_1 &= 0 \\
n_1\sigma_1^2 - 2n_1\sigma_1\sigma_\text{n} + \left(\sigma_\text{n}^2 - \tau_\text{n}^2\right) n_1 &= 0 \\
\left(\sigma_1^2 - 2\sigma_1\sigma_\text{n} + \sigma_\text{n}^2 - \tau_\text{n}^2\right) n_1 &= 0 \\
\end{align}$$

Doing the same for the other two equations we have

$$\frac{\partial F}{\partial n_2} = \left(\sigma_2^2 - 2\sigma_2\sigma_\text{n} + \sigma_\text{n}^2 - \tau_\text{n}^2\right) n_2 = 0$$
$$\frac{\partial F}{\partial n_3} = \left(\sigma_3^2 - 2\sigma_3\sigma_\text{n} + \sigma_\text{n}^2 - \tau_\text{n}^2\right) n_3 = 0$$

A first approach to solve these last three equations is to consider the trivial solution $n_i = 0$. However, this option does not fulfill the constraint $n_i n_i = 1$.

Considering the solution where $n_1 = n_2 = 0$ and $n_3 \neq 0$, it is determine from the condition $n_i n_i = 1$ that $n_3 = \pm 1$, then from the original equation for $\tau_\text{n}^2$ it is seen that $\tau_\text{n} = 0$. The other two possible values for $\tau_\text{n}$ can be obtained similarly by assuming

$n_1 = n_3 = 0$ and $n_2 \neq 0$
$n_2 = n_3 = 0$ and $n_1 \neq 0$

Thus, one set of solutions for these four equations is:

$$\begin{align}
n_1 &= 0,     & n_2 &= 0,     & n_3 &= \pm 1, & \tau_\text{n} &= 0 \\
n_1 &= 0,     & n_2 &= \pm 1, & n_3 &= 0,     & \tau_\text{n} &= 0 \\
n_1 &= \pm 1, & n_2 &= 0,     & n_3 &= 0,     & \tau_\text{n} &= 0
\end{align}$$

These correspond to minimum values for $\tau_\mathrm{n}$ and verifies that there are no shear stresses on planes normal to the principal directions of stress, as shown previously.

A second set of solutions is obtained by assuming $n_1 = 0$, $n_2 \neq 0$ and $n_3 \neq 0$. Thus we have

$$\frac{\partial F}{\partial n_2} = \sigma_2^2 - 2\sigma_2\sigma_\text{n} + \sigma_\text{n}^2 - \tau_\text{n}^2 = 0$$
$$\frac{\partial F}{\partial n_3} = \sigma_3^2 - 2\sigma_3\sigma_\text{n} + \sigma_\text{n}^2 - \tau_\text{n}^2 = 0$$

To find the values for $n_2$ and $n_3$ we first add these two equations

$$\begin{align}
\sigma_2^2 - \sigma_3^2 - 2\sigma_2\sigma_\text{n} + 2\sigma_3\sigma_\text{n} &= 0 \\
\sigma_2^2 - \sigma_3^2 - 2\sigma_\text{n}\left(\sigma_2 - \sigma_3\right) &= 0 \\
\sigma_2 + \sigma_3 &= 2\sigma_\text{n}
\end{align}$$

Knowing that for $n_1 = 0$

$$\sigma_\text{n} = \sigma_1 n_1^2 + \sigma_2n_2^2 + \sigma_3 n_3^2 = \sigma_2 n_2^2 + \sigma_3 n_3^2$$

and

$$n_1^2 + n_2^2 + n_3^2 = n_2^2 + n_3^2 = 1$$

we have

$$\begin{align}
\sigma_2+\sigma_3 &= 2\sigma_\text{n} \\
\sigma_2+\sigma_3 &= 2\left(\sigma_2n_2^2 + \sigma_3n_3^2\right) \\
\sigma_2+\sigma_3 &= 2\left(\sigma_2n_2^2 + \sigma_3\left(1-n_2^2\right)\right) = 0
\end{align}$$

and solving for $n_2$ we have

$$n_2 = \pm\frac{1}{\sqrt 2}$$

Then solving for $n_3$ we have

$$n_3 = \sqrt{1 - n_2^2} = \pm\frac{1}{\sqrt 2}$$

and

$$\begin{align}
\tau_\text{n}^2 &= (\sigma_2 - \sigma_3)^2 n_2^2 n_3^2 \\
\tau_\text{n} &= \frac{\sigma_2 - \sigma_3}{2}
\end{align}$$

The other two possible values for $\tau_\text{n}$ can be obtained similarly by assuming

$n_2 = 0$, $n_1 \neq 0$ and $n_3 \neq 0$
$n_3 = 0$, $n_1 \neq 0$ and $n_2 \neq 0$

Therefore, the second set of solutions for $\textstyle \frac{\partial F}{\partial n_1} = 0$, representing a maximum for $\tau_\text{n}$ is

$$n_1 = 0,\,\,n_2 = \pm\frac{1}{\sqrt 2},\,\,n_3 = \pm\frac{1}{\sqrt 2},\,\,\tau_\text{n} = \pm\frac{\sigma_2 - \sigma_3}{2}$$
$$n_1 = \pm\frac{1}{\sqrt 2},\,\,n_2 = 0,\,\,n_3 = \pm\frac{1}{\sqrt 2},\,\,\tau_\text{n} = \pm\frac{\sigma_1 - \sigma_3}{2}$$
$$n_1 = \pm\frac{1}{\sqrt 2},\,\,n_2 = \pm\frac{1}{\sqrt 2},\,\,n_3 = 0,\,\,\tau_\text{n} = \pm\frac{\sigma_1 - \sigma_2}{2}$$

Therefore, assuming $\sigma_1 \ge \sigma_2 \ge \sigma_3$, the maximum shear stress is expressed by

$$\tau_\max = \frac{1}{2}\left|\sigma_1 - \sigma_3\right| = \frac{1}{2}\left|\sigma_\max - \sigma_\min\right|$$

and it can be stated as being equal to one-half the difference between the largest and smallest principal stresses, acting on the plane that bisects the angle between the directions of the largest and smallest principal stresses.

== Stress deviator tensor ==
The stress tensor $\sigma_{ij}$ can be expressed as the sum of two other stress tensors:

1. a mean hydrostatic stress tensor or volumetric stress tensor or mean normal stress tensor, $\pi\delta_{ij}$, which tends to change the volume of the stressed body; and
2. a deviatoric component called the stress deviator tensor, $s_{ij}$, which tends to distort it.

So

$$\sigma_{ij} = s_{ij} + \pi\delta_{ij},$$

where $\pi$ is the mean stress given by

$$\pi = \frac{\sigma_{kk}}{3} = \frac{\sigma_{11} + \sigma_{22} + \sigma_{33}}{3} = \frac{1}{3}I_1.$$

Pressure ($p$) is generally defined as negative one-third the trace of the stress tensor minus any stress the divergence of the velocity contributes with, i.e.

$$p = \zeta\, \nabla\cdot\vec{u} - \pi = \zeta\,\frac{\partial u_k}{\partial x_k} - \pi = \sum_k\zeta\,\frac{\partial u_k}{\partial x_k} - \pi,$$

where $\zeta$ is a proportionality constant (viz. the Volume viscosity), $\nabla\cdot$ is the divergence operator, $x_k$ is the kth Cartesian coordinate, $\vec{u}$ is the flow velocity and $u_k$ is the kth Cartesian component of $\vec{u}$.

The deviatoric stress tensor can be obtained by subtracting the hydrostatic stress tensor from the Cauchy stress tensor:

$$\begin{align}
s_{ij} &= \sigma_{ij} - \frac{\sigma_{kk}}{3}\delta_{ij},\,\\
\left[{\begin{matrix}
s_{11} & s_{12} & s_{13} \\
s_{21} & s_{22} & s_{23} \\
s_{31} & s_{32} & s_{33}
\end{matrix}}\right]
&= \left[{\begin{matrix}
\sigma_{11} & \sigma_{12} & \sigma_{13} \\
\sigma_{21} & \sigma_{22} & \sigma_{23} \\
\sigma_{31} & \sigma_{32} & \sigma_{33}
\end{matrix}}\right] - \left[{\begin{matrix}
\pi & 0   & 0   \\
0   & \pi & 0   \\
0   & 0   & \pi
\end{matrix}}\right] \\
&= \left[{\begin{matrix}
\sigma_{11} - \pi & \sigma_{12}       & \sigma_{13}       \\
\sigma_{21}       & \sigma_{22} - \pi & \sigma_{23}       \\
\sigma_{31}       & \sigma_{32}       & \sigma_{33} - \pi
\end{matrix}}\right].
\end{align}$$

=== Invariants of the stress deviator tensor ===
As it is a second order tensor, the stress deviator tensor also has a set of invariants, which can be obtained using the same procedure used to calculate the invariants of the stress tensor. It can be shown that the principal directions of the stress deviator tensor $s_{ij}$ are the same as the principal directions of the stress tensor $\sigma_{ij}$. Thus, the characteristic equation is

$$\left|s_{ij} - \lambda\delta_{ij}\right| = \lambda^3 - J_1\lambda^2 - J_2\lambda - J_3 = 0,$$

where $J_1$, $J_2$ and $J_3$ are the first, second, and third deviatoric stress invariants, respectively. Their values are the same (invariant) regardless of the orientation of the coordinate system chosen. These deviatoric stress invariants can be expressed as a function of the components of $s_{ij}$ or its principal values $s_1$, $s_2$, and $s_3$, or alternatively, as a function of $\sigma_{ij}$ or its principal values $\sigma_1$, $\sigma_2$, and $\sigma_3$. Thus,

$$\begin{align}
J_1 &= s_{kk}=0, \\[3pt]
J_2 &= \frac{1}{2} s_{ij}s_{ji} = \frac{1}{2}\operatorname{tr}\left(\boldsymbol{s}^2\right) \\
&= \frac{1}{2}\left(s_1^2 + s_2^2 + s_3^2\right) \\
&= \frac{1}{6}\left[(\sigma_{11} - \sigma_{22})^2 + (\sigma_{22} - \sigma_{33})^2 + (\sigma_{33} - \sigma_{11})^2 \right ] + \sigma_{12}^2 + \sigma_{23}^2 + \sigma_{31}^2 \\
&= \frac{1}{6}\left[(\sigma_1 - \sigma_2)^2 + (\sigma_2 - \sigma_3)^2 + (\sigma_3 - \sigma_1)^2 \right] \\
&= \frac{1}{3}I_1^2 - I_2 = \frac{1}{2}\left[\operatorname{tr}\left(\boldsymbol{\sigma}^2\right) - \frac{1}{3}\operatorname{tr}(\boldsymbol{\sigma})^2\right], \\[3pt]
J_3 &= \det(s_{ij}) \\
&= \frac{1}{3}s_{ij}s_{jk}s_{ki} = \frac{1}{3} \text{tr}\left(\boldsymbol{s}^3\right) \\
&= \frac{1}{3}\left(s_1^3 + s_2^3 + s_3^3\right) \\
&= s_1 s_2 s_3 \\
&= \frac{2}{27}I_1^3 - \frac{1}{3}I_1 I_2 + I_3 = \frac{1}{3}\left[\text{tr}(\boldsymbol{\sigma}^3) - \operatorname{tr}\left(\boldsymbol{\sigma}^2\right) \operatorname{tr}(\boldsymbol{\sigma}) + \frac{2}{9}\operatorname{tr}(\boldsymbol{\sigma})^3\right].\,
\end{align}$$

Because $s_{kk} = 0$, the stress deviator tensor is in a state of pure shear.

A quantity called the equivalent stress or von Mises stress is commonly used in solid mechanics. The equivalent stress is defined as

$$\sigma_\text{vM} = \sqrt{3\,J_2} = \sqrt{\frac{1}{2}~\left[(\sigma_1 - \sigma_2)^2 + (\sigma_2 - \sigma_3)^2 + (\sigma_3 - \sigma_1)^2\right]}\,.$$

== Octahedral stresses ==
Figure 6. Octahedral stress planes

Considering the principal directions as the coordinate axes, a plane whose normal vector makes equal angles with each of the principal axes (i.e. having direction cosines equal to $\vert 1/\sqrt{3} \vert$) is called an octahedral plane. There are a total of eight octahedral planes (Figure 6). The normal and shear components of the stress tensor on these planes are called octahedral normal stress $\sigma_\text{oct}$ and octahedral shear stress $\tau_\text{oct}$, respectively. Octahedral plane passing through the origin is known as the π-plane (π not to be confused with mean stress denoted by π in above section) . On the π-plane, $\textstyle s_{ij} = \frac{1}{3} I$.

Knowing that the stress tensor of point O (Figure 6) in the principal axes is

$$\sigma_{ij} =
\begin{bmatrix}
\sigma_1 & 0 & 0\\
0 & \sigma_2 & 0\\
0 & 0 & \sigma_3
\end{bmatrix}$$

the stress vector on an octahedral plane is then given by:

$$\begin{align}
\mathbf{T}_\text{oct}^{(\mathbf{n})} &= \sigma_{ij} n_i\mathbf{e}_j \\
&= \sigma_1 n_1\mathbf{e}_1 + \sigma_2 n_2\mathbf{e}_2 + \sigma_3 n_3\mathbf{e}_3\\
&= \frac{1}{\sqrt{3}}(\sigma_1\mathbf{e}_1 + \sigma_2\mathbf{e}_2 + \sigma_3\mathbf{e}_3)
\end{align}$$

The normal component of the stress vector at point O associated with the octahedral plane is

$$\begin{align}
\sigma_\text{oct} &= T^{(n)}_i n_i \\
&= \sigma_{ij}n_i n_j \\
&= \sigma_1 n_1 n_1 + \sigma_2 n_2 n_2 + \sigma_3 n_3 n_3 \\
&= \frac{1}{3}(\sigma_1 + \sigma_2 + \sigma_3) = \frac{1}{3}I_1
\end{align}$$

which is the mean normal stress or hydrostatic stress. This value is the same in all eight octahedral planes. The shear stress on the octahedral plane is then

$$\begin{align}
\tau_\text{oct}
&= \sqrt{T_i^{(n)} T_i^{(n)} - \sigma_\text{oct}^2} \\
&= \left[\frac{1}{3}\left(\sigma_1^2 + \sigma_2^2 + \sigma_3^2\right) - \frac{1}{9}(\sigma_1 + \sigma_2 + \sigma_3)^2\right]^\frac{1}{2} \\
&= \frac{1}{3}\left[(\sigma_1 - \sigma_2)^2 + (\sigma_2 - \sigma_3)^2 + (\sigma_3 - \sigma_1)^2\right]^\frac{1}{2} = \frac{1}{3}\sqrt{2I_1^2 - 6I_2} = \sqrt{\frac{2}{3}J_2}
\end{align}$$

== See also ==
- Cauchy momentum equation
- Critical plane analysis
- Stress–energy tensor
- Eshelby stress tensor
