= Eshelby stress tensor =

Tensor field quantity

In continuum mechanics, the Eshelby stress tensor is a tensor field quantity that describes the energy changes and forces acting on defects, cracks, or dislocations inside a material reference lattice.

While a standard Cauchy stress tensor $\mathbf{\sigma }$ describes the forces acting on the physical atoms or mass particles themselves, the Eshelby tensor looks at the material from a thermodynamic and structural standpoint. It describes forces associated with changes in the material configuration rather than ordinary spatial forces. The Eshelby tensor represents the spatial (or material) part of the broader relativistic stress-energy tensor mapped into classical solid mechanics.

The tensor is named after John Douglas Eshelby (1916–1981), a pioneering British materials scientist and physicist.

== Definition ==
In the context of the $J$-integral, the Eshelby tensor $\mathbf{H}$ (in index notation, $H_{kj}$) is defined as:

$$H_{kj} = W \delta_{kj} - \sigma_{ij} \frac{\partial u_{i}}{\partial x_{k}}$$

where:

- $W$ is the strain energy density of the material.
- $\delta_{kj}$ is the Kronecker delta (the identity matrix).
- $\sigma_{ij}$ is the Cauchy stress tensor.
- $\frac{\partial u_{i}}{\partial x_{k}}$ is the displacement gradient tensor.

The Eshelby tensor can also be defined via the Piola–Kirchhoff stress tensors:

$$H= W I - (\nabla u)^T P$$

where:

- $W$ is the strain energy density in the original configuration,
- $I$ is the identity matrix,
- $\nabla u$ is the displacement gradient, and
- $P$ is the first Piola-Kirchhoff stress tensor.

== Connection to the J-integral ==
In a two-dimensional quasi-static system, the global material force vector $F_k$ acting on a defect enclosed by a contour $\Gamma$ is defined by the line integral of the Eshelby tensor:

$$F_k = \oint_{\Gamma} H_{kj} n_j \, d\Gamma$$

where $n_j$ is the outward unit normal vector to the contour.

=== Generalized Vector Form ===
The J-integral can be generalized into a configurational force vector $J_i$ representing the components of the energy release rate along any arbitrary coordinate axis $x_i$. In terms of the Eshelby tensor (and in index notation), this is written as:

$$J_i := \lim_{\varepsilon\rightarrow 0} \int_{\Gamma_\varepsilon} H_{ij} n_j \, d\Gamma = \lim_{\varepsilon\rightarrow 0} \int_{\Gamma_\varepsilon} \left(W n_i - n_j \sigma_{jk} \frac{\partial u_k}{\partial x_i}\right) d\Gamma$$

where:

- $\Gamma_\varepsilon$ is a shrinking contour of radius $\varepsilon$ immediately surrounding the crack tip.
- $H_{ij}$ is the components of the Eshelby stress tensor.
- All other field variables ($W$, $\sigma$, $u$) are evaluated along the contour path as a function of spatial coordinates.

== See also ==
- J-integral
- Stress energy tensor
- Fracture mechanics
- Finite strain theory
- Helmholtz and Gibbs free energy in thermoelasticity
