= Lamé's stress ellipsoid =

Geometric representation of internal forces in a continuous material

Lamé's stress ellipsoid is an alternative to Mohr's circle for the graphical representation of the stress state at a point. The surface of the ellipsoid represents the locus of the endpoints of all stress vectors acting on all planes passing through a given point in the continuum body. In other words, the endpoints of all stress vectors at a given point in the continuum body lie on the stress ellipsoid surface, i.e., the radius-vector from the center of the ellipsoid, located at the material point in consideration, to a point on the surface of the ellipsoid is equal to the stress vector on some plane passing through the point. In two dimensions, the surface is represented by an ellipse.

Once the equations of the ellipsoid is known, the magnitude of the stress vector can then be obtained for any plane passing through that point.

To determine the equation of the stress ellipsoid we consider the coordinate axes $x_1, x_2, x_3\,\!$ taken in the directions of the principal axes, i.e., in a principal stress space. Thus, the coordinates of the stress vector $\mathbf T^{(\mathbf n)}\,\!$ on a plane with normal unit vector $\mathbf n\,\!$ passing through a given point $P\,\!$ is represented by

$$T_1^{(\mathbf n)}=\sigma_1n_1, \qquad T_2^{(\mathbf n)}=\sigma_2n_2, \qquad T_3^{(\mathbf n)}=\sigma_3n_3\,$$

And knowing that $\mathbf n\,\!$ is a unit vector we have

$$n_1^2+n_2^2+n_3^2=\frac{T_1^2}{\sigma_1^2}+\frac{T_2^2}{\sigma_2^2}+\frac{T_3^2}{\sigma_3^2}=1\,$$

which is the equation of an ellipsoid centered at the origin of the coordinate system, with the lengths of the semiaxes of the ellipsoid equal to the magnitudes of the principal stresses, i.e. the intercepts of the ellipsoid with the principal axes are $\pm\sigma_1, \pm\sigma_2, \pm\sigma_3\,\!$.

- The first stress invariant $I_1\,\!$ is directly proportional to the sum of the principal radii of the ellipsoid.
- The second stress invariant $I_2\,\!$ is directly proportional to the sum of the three principal areas of the ellipsoid. The three principal areas are the ellipses on each principal plane.
- The third stress invariant $I_3\,\!$ is directly proportional to the volume of the ellipsoid.
- If two of the three principal stresses are numerically equal the stress ellipsoid becomes an ellipsoid of revolution. Thus, two principal areas are ellipses and the third is a circle.
- If all of the principal stresses are equal and of the same sign, the stress ellipsoid becomes a sphere and any three perpendicular directions can be taken as principal axes.

The stress ellipsoid by itself, however, does not indicate the plane on which the given traction vector acts. Only for the case where the stress vector lies along one of the principal directions it is possible to know the direction of the plane, as the principal stresses act perpendicular to their planes. To find the orientation of any other plane we used the stress-director surface or stress director quadric represented by the equation

$$\frac{x_1^2}{{\sigma_1}}+\frac{x_2^2}{{\sigma_2}}+\frac{x_3^2}{{\sigma_3}}=1$$

The stress represented by a radius-vector of the stress ellipsoid acts on a plane oriented parallel to the tangent plane to the stress-director surface at the point of its intersection with the radius-vector.

== Bibliography ==
- Timoshenko, Stephen P.; James Norman Goodier (1970). Theory of Elasticity (Third ed.). McGraw-Hill International Editions. ISBN 0-07-085805-5.
- Timoshenko, Stephen P. (1983). History of strength of materials: with a brief account of the history of theory of elasticity and theory of structures. Dover Books on Physics. Dover Publications. ISBN 0-486-61187-6.
