= Michelle Sabick =

American biomechanical engineer

- Occupation: Academic
- Education: Case Western Reserve University (BSc), University of Iowa (MSc, PhD)
- Scientific career
- Fields: Biomechanics, Orthopedic Biomechanics, Sports Medicine
- Institutions: University of Denver

Website
- Profile at University of Denver

Michelle B. Sabick is an American biomechanical engineer specializing in the biomechanics of athletic performance and the applications of biomechanics to sports medicine. She is the dean of engineering at the University of Denver, the former dean of engineering at Saint Louis University, and the former president of the American Society of Biomechanics.

== Education and career ==
Sabick studied biomedical engineering as an undergraduate at Case Western Reserve University. She continued her studies as a graduate student at the University of Iowa, earning a Master's degree and Ph.D. She became a postdoctoral researcher at the Mayo Clinic and then a researcher at the Steadman-Hawkins Sports Medicine Foundation in Colorado, at that time also holding adjunct faculty positions at Colorado State University and the Colorado School of Mines.

Sabick returned to academia as a faculty member at Boise State University, becoming chair of mechanical and biomedical engineering from 2011 to 2014; she was promoted to full professor in 2012. She moved to Saint Louis University as chair of biomedical engineering in 2014. In 2016, she was appointed as dean of the university's Parks College of Engineering, Aviation and Technology. In 2021 she moved again, to her current position as dean at the University of Denver.

Sabick was president of the American Society of Biomechanics for the 2019–2020 term. She was named as a Fellow of the American Society of Biomechanics in 2022.
