= Biomechanical =

Biomechanical may refer to:

- Biomechanics, the application of mechanical principles to living organisms
  - Sports biomechanics, a quantitative based study and analysis of professional athletes and sports' activities in general
  - Forensic Biomechanics, use of biomechanics in litigation.
- Biomechanics (Meyerhold), system of actor training developed by Vsevolod Meyerhold
- Biomechanicals, 2019 album by Metalite
- Biomechanical art, the style of H. R. Giger and those influenced by him, like tattooist Guy Aitchison
- Biomechanical (band), a progressive groove metal band from London, UK
- Biomechanical engineering, a bioengineering subdiscipline which applies principles of mechanical engineering to biological systems
- Biomechanical Toy, a scrolling shoot 'em up platform arcade game released by Gaelco in 1995

It may also refer to:

- Bioengineering, the application of concepts and methods of biology to solve real-world problems
- Biomaterial, any matter, surface, or construct that interacts with biological systems
- Biorobotics, a term that loosely covers the fields of cybernetics, bionics and even genetic engineering as a collective study
- Bioship, an organic spaceship
- Biomechanoid, a cyborg
- Organic (model), methods and patterns found in living systems
- Ocean Machine: Biomech, the debut 1997 studio album by Canadian musician Devin Townsend
