= Steven Vogel =

American biologist at Duke University (1940–2015)

- Born: April 7, 1940; Beacon, New York, US
- Died: November 24, 2015 (aged 75); Durham, North Carolina, US
- Education: Harvard University; Tufts University
- Scientific career
- Fields: Biomechanics
- Workplaces: Duke University

Steven Vogel (April 7, 1940 – November 24, 2015) was an American biomechanics researcher, the James B. Duke professor in the Department of Biology at Duke University.

== Life ==
Vogel was born in Beacon, New York, and educated there and in Poughkeepsie. He graduated from Tufts University and was awarded his graduate degrees from Harvard University. Vogel joined Duke University as an assistant professor in the Zoology department in 1966, and taught there for 40 years, eventually retiring as professor emeritus.

Over the course of his professional career, Vogel, along with Stephen Wainwright and Robert McNeill Alexander, played a fundamental role in the establishment of the discipline of biomechanics, and was a prolific author of popular works on the intersection of physics and biology. His research projects included studies of ventilation currents in prairie dog burrows, flight in tiny insects, leaf streamlining, air movement through feathery moth antennae, and the mechanics of jet propulsion in squid and scallops. Vogel died of cancer in Durham, North Carolina on November 24, 2015.

== Works ==
In English:

- Life in Moving Fluids: The Physical Biology of Flow. Princeton University Press (1981; 2nd ed. 1996).
- Life's Devices: The Physical World of Animals and Plants. Princeton University Press (1988).
- Vital Circuits: On Pumps, Pipes, and the Workings of Circulatory Systems. Oxford University Press (1993).
- Cats' Paws and Catapults: Mechanical Worlds of Nature and People. W.W. Norton (1998).
- Prime Mover: a Natural History of Muscle. W. W. Norton & Co. (2002).
- Comparative Biomechanics: Life's Physical World. Princeton University Press (2003).
- Glimpses of Creatures in Their Mechanical Worlds. Princeton University Press (2009).
- The Life of a Leaf. University of Chicago Press, ISBN 9780226104775 (2012).
- Why the Wheel Is Round: Muscles, Technology, and How We Make Things Move. University of Chicago Press, ISBN 9780226381039 (2016).
