= Stephen A. Wainwright =

American zoologist and biomechanist (1931–2019)

- Born: October 9, 1931; Indianapolis, Indiana, U.S.
- Died: December 12, 2019 (aged 88); Chapel Hill, North Carolina, U.S.
- Education: Duke University (B.S.); University of Cambridge; University of California, Berkeley (Ph.D.)
- Known for: Comparative biomechanics; mechanical design approaches to organismal form and function; fiber-reinforced body walls and shark-skin mechanics
- Awards: Fellow, American Association for the Advancement of Science (AAAS)
- Scientific career
- Fields: Biomechanics; Functional morphology Zoology
- Workplaces: Duke University

Stephen A. Wainwright (October 9, 1931 – December 12, 2019) was an American zoologist and comparative biomechanist at Duke University. His research applied principles from mechanics and engineering to biological form and function and helped establish comparative biomechanics as a field.

Wainwright co-authored the book Mechanical Design in Organisms (1976), an early integrative text in biomechanics and functional morphology. He later co-founded Duke's BioDesign Studio (1990), which paired scientific questions with hands-on model-making and fabrication to test ideas about how organisms work. After retiring from Duke, he pursued sculpture and supported science and art education initiatives in North Carolina.

== Early life and education ==
Wainwright was born in Indianapolis, Indiana, on October 9, 1931. He earned a B.S. from Duke University in 1953, pursued additional study at the University of Cambridge, and completed a Ph.D. at the University of California, Berkeley in 1962. Other accounts note postgraduate study at the University of Hawaii prior to the Ph.D. He held postdoctoral appointments at the Karolinska Institute (Sweden) and at the Woods Hole Oceanographic Institution (Massachusetts).

== Academic career ==
Wainwright joined the Duke University Department of Zoology faculty in 1964 and later held emeritus status as a James B. Duke Professor of Zoology.

In the biomechanics community, Wainwright served in leadership roles including president of the American Society of Biomechanics (1981) and president of the American Society of Zoologists (1988), later renamed the Society for Integrative and Comparative Biology.

== Research contributions ==
Wainwright's research examined how biological structures support loads, resist damage, and enable movement. Duke sources describe his central contribution as explaining how alternating layers of helically wound fibers can reinforce and streamline the body walls of many animals, providing combinations of flexibility and stiffness used in locomotion and other functions.

In a 1978 Science paper with coauthors, he analyzed the mechanical role of shark skin, describing how fiber organization and internal pressures influence stiffness and the transmission of muscular forces.

== BioDesign Studio and biomimetic design ==
Wainwright co-founded the Duke BioDesign Studio in 1990 with artist Chuck Pell, described in Duke reporting as an art studio embedded in an academic science setting where researchers and artists built physical models to test hypotheses about biological structures and movement. A later Duke Today report on student engineering projects noted that Pell joined Wainwright to start the BioDesign Studio and that their work contributed to the creation of a company (Nekton) focused on devices inspired by biological mechanisms.

== Teaching and mentorship ==
Duke accounts describe Wainwright as emphasizing model-building and hands-on design as part of biomechanics training, encouraging students to construct three-dimensional models of biological systems to evaluate and refine mechanistic explanations. The University of Washington's Friday Harbor Laboratories notes that he co-taught a biomechanics summer course there in 1980 and that former students continued related teaching and research activities at the laboratory afterward.

== Art and public engagement ==
After retiring from Duke, Wainwright worked as a sculptor and was involved in education and outreach efforts, including establishing the Center for Inquiry-Based Learning and SeeSaw Studio, an after-school program for young artists in Durham. Duke reporting also notes that he and his wife Ruth commissioned the campus sculpture Scientist and Nature honoring physiologist Knut Schmidt-Nielsen.

== Legacy ==
The Society for Integrative and Comparative Biology has named student awards in his honor, including the Stephen A. Wainwright Student Research Award (funded 2020–2024) and a divisional award for student presentations in biomechanics jointly named for Mimi A. R. Koehl and Stephen A. Wainwright.

== Selected works ==
- Wainwright, S. A.; Biggs, W. D.; Currey, J. D.; Gosline, J. M. Mechanical Design in Organisms. Edward Arnold (1976).
- Wainwright, S. A. Axis and Circumference: The Cylindrical Shape of Plants and Animals. Harvard University Press (1988).
- Wainwright, S. A.; Vosburgh, F.; Hebrank, J. H. “Shark skin: function in locomotion.” Science (1978).
