= Robin Queen (biomechanist) =

American biomechanist

Robin Marie Queen
- Education: Doctor of Philosophy in Biomedical Engineering, University of North Carolina at Chapel Hill (2004)
- Known for: Foot and ankle biomechanics; sports biomechanics; footwear biomechanics
- Awards: Jean Landa Pytel Award for Diversity Mentorship in Biomechanics, American Society of Biomechanics (2023); Adele Boskey Award, Orthopaedic Research Society (2020); Kappa Delta Young Investigator Award (2017)
- Honours: Fellow of the American Institute for Medical and Biological Engineering (2022); Fellow of the American Society of Biomechanics (2021); Fellow of the American College of Sports Medicine (2014); Fellow of the International Combined Orthopaedic Research Societies (2019); Honorary Doctor of Science, Union College (2022)
- Website: beam.vt.edu/people/faculty/queen.html

Robin Marie Queen is an American biomechanist and a professor of biomedical engineering and mechanics at Virginia Tech. Her work involves research on foot and ankle biomechanics, sports biomechanics, and footwear biomechanics.

== Education ==
Queen earned a Bachelor of Science in Applied Science – Biomaterials with a minor in Physics from the University of North Carolina at Chapel Hill in 2000. She completed her Master of Science in Biomedical Engineering in 2001 and Doctor of Philosophy in Biomedical Engineering in 2004 at the same institution.

== Academic career ==
Queen worked as a graduate teaching assistant and project coordinator at the University of North Carolina at Chapel Hill before joining Duke University Medical Center, where she was Director of the Michael W. Krzyzewski Human Performance Lab and Medical Instructor in Surgery and Orthopedic Surgery.

She joined Virginia Tech in 2015 as an Associate Professor in the Department of Biomedical Engineering and Mechanics, later becoming a full professor. Queen also directs the Kevin P. Granata Biomechanics Laboratory and holds affiliate appointments with the Edward Via College of Osteopathic Medicine and the Virginia Tech Carilion School of Medicine and Research Institute.

== Research ==
Queen's research focuses on applying biomechanical methods to assess human motion, performance, and rehabilitation. Her work includes studies on plantar loading, movement symmetry, and the effects of footwear on athletic and clinical outcomes. Her studies are often applied to orthopedic rehabilitation and sports medicine.

== Professional activities ==
Queen has served on committees and editorial boards in the field of biomechanics and orthopaedic research. She is a fellow of several professional organizations, including the American Institute for Medical and Biological Engineering and the American Society of Biomechanics.

She has received recognition from professional societies, including the Jean Landa Pytel Award for Diversity Mentorship in Biomechanics (2023), the Adele Boskey Award (2020), and the Kappa Delta Young Investigator Award (2017).

== Selected publications ==
JM Brisbane, MBA McCullough, C Baker, JS London, RM Queen. Impact of Race, Gait Speed and Arch Height on Plantar Loading. Journal of Biomechanics (In Press).

R Hatfield, H Sheppard, AT Peebles, KR Ford, JM Hart, RM Queen. Using load sensing insoles to identify knee kinetic asymmetries during landing in patients with an ACL reconstruction. Clinical Biomechanics (In Press).

N Stark, J Streamer, RM Queen. Patients with Unilateral Ankle Arthritis Have Decreased Ankle and Limb Loading Symmetry Compared to Healthy Controls. Journal of Orthopaedic Research (In Press).

B Chuckpaiwong, JA. Nunley, NA Mall, RM Queen. The effect of foot type on in-shoe plantar pressure during walking and running. Gait & Posture.
