= Elizabeth Hsiao-Wecksler =

American biomechanics researcher

Elizabeth T. Hsiao-Wecksler is an American biomechanics researcher specializing in human gait and balance, and in the design of devices for assisting in gait and posture. She is the Director of Applied Health Technology and Design in the Grainger College of engineering at the University of Illinois Urbana-Champaign.

== Education and career ==
Hsiao-Wecksler majored in mechanical engineering at Cornell University, graduating in 1987, and began working in industry in the desktop printing and copying division of Xerox. While doing so, she earned a master's degree at the Rochester Institute of Technology in 1994. She returned to graduate study in biomechanics in 1995, working with Stephen Robinovitch at the University of California, San Francisco and University of California, Berkeley, and completed a Ph.D. in mechanical engineering at Berkeley in 2000.

After postdoctoral research with James Collins at Boston University and Lewis Lipsitz and Casey Kerrigan at the Harvard Medical School, she became an assistant professor of mechanical science and mechanical engineering at the University of Illinois Urbana-Champaign in 2002. She earned tenure there as an associate professor in 2009, becoming the first tenured woman in the department, and was promoted to full professor in 2015.

She also co-founded a spin-off company, IntelliWheels, in 2010, focusing on the improved design of geared wheels for wheelchairs, and was its scientific advisor through 2018.

== Personal life and activism ==
Hsiao-Wecksler co-founded LGBTQ advocacy groups at both Xerox and the UC Berkeley College of Engineering, and has been an advocate for inclusion and diversity more generally at the University of Illinois.

== Recognition ==
Hsiao-Wecksler was named an ASME Fellow in 2014, and a Fellow of the American Society of Biomechanics in 2018. She was president of the American Society of Biomechanics for the 2021–2022 term.

The Society of Women Engineers named her a Distinguished Engineering Educator in 2018, "for steadfast commitment to student success and project-based and team-based learning; for leadership in revamping engineering curricula; and for serving as an encouraging role model and mentor".

Hsiao-Wecksler was named a Grayce Wicall Gauthier Professor in 2023 and received the Two-Year Alumni Effective Teaching Award in 2024.
