= Jennifer Hicks =

Biomechanics researcher

Jennifer Hicks is a biomechanist in the Neuromuscular Biomechanics Lab at Stanford University and Director of Research and Development for the OpenSim software.

== Biography ==
Hicks is an American engineer and researcher specializing in mechanical engineering and human movement disorders. She earned a Bachelor of Science from the University of Delaware and a Master of Science from Stanford University. She did her Ph.D. in Mechanical Engineering with Professor Scott Delp at Stanford University in 2010. Her doctoral research focused on objectively identifying biomechanical factors that cause children with cerebral palsy to walk with excess knee flexion and, second, to use these factors to predict whether a patient's crouch gait will improve after receiving treatment applying computer modeling simulations.

== Research career ==
Hicks is the executive director of the Wu Tsai Human Performance Alliance at Stanford University, where she leads collaborative research projects and programs aimed at advancing the understanding of the biological principles underlying human performance. She also serves as the director of research for both the Mobilize Center, an NIH Biomedical Technology Resource Center at Stanford, and the Restore Center, an NIH-funded initiative that integrates cutting-edge engineering tools into rehabilitation science.
