= Anne-Virginie Salsac =

French bioengineer

Anne-Virginie Salsac (born 1977) is a French biomechanical engineer whose research focuses on hemodynamics, the mechanical behavior of blood cells, microcapsules, and other particles or droplets as they pass through blood vessels. She is a director of research for the French National Centre for Scientific Research (CNRS), associated with the Biomechanics and Bioengineering Laboratory (BMBI) of CNRS and the University of Technology of Compiègne.

== Education and career ==
Salsac was born in 1977 in Strasbourg, and received an engineering degree from the École nationale supérieure d'hydraulique et de mécanique de Grenoble in 2000. She continued her studies at the University of California, San Diego in California (UCSD), where she received a master's degree in 2001 and completed her Ph.D. in mechanical engineering in 2005. Her dissertation, Changes in the Hemodynamic Stresses Occurring During the Enlargement of Abdominal Aortic Aneurysms, was co-chaired by Juan C. Lasheras and Jean-Marc Chomaz, jointly through UCSD and the École polytechnique.

After two years as a lecturer at University College London, she joined CNRS in 2007. She received a habilitation through the University of Technology of Compiègne in 2013, and was promoted to director of research in 2018.

== Recognition ==
Salsac received the CNRS Bronze Medal in 2015 and the CNRS Silver Medal in 2025.
