= Arruda–Boyce model =

In continuum mechanics, an Arruda–Boyce model is a hyperelastic constitutive model used to describe the mechanical behavior of rubber and other polymeric substances. This model is based on the statistical mechanics of a material with a cubic representative volume element containing eight chains along the diagonal directions. The material is assumed to be incompressible. The model is named after Ellen Arruda and Mary Cunningham Boyce, who published it in 1993.

The strain energy density function for the incompressible Arruda–Boyce model is given by

$$W = Nk_B\theta\sqrt{n}\left[\beta\lambda_\text{chain} - \sqrt{n}\ln\left(\cfrac{\sinh\beta}{\beta}\right)\right],$$

where $n$ is the number of chain segments, $k_B$ is the Boltzmann constant, $\theta$ is the temperature in kelvins, $N$ is the number of chains in the network of a cross-linked polymer,

$$\lambda_{\mathrm{chain}} = \sqrt{\tfrac{I_1}{3}}, \quad \beta = \mathcal{L}^{-1}\left(\cfrac{\lambda_\text{chain}}{\sqrt{n}}\right),$$

where $I_1$ is the first invariant of the left Cauchy–Green deformation tensor, and $\mathcal{L}^{-1}(x)$ is the inverse Langevin function which can be approximated by

$$\mathcal{L}^{-1}(x) = \begin{cases}
1.31\tan(1.59 x) + 0.91 x & \text{for}\ |x| < 0.841, \\
\tfrac{1}{\sgn(x)-x}      & \text{for}\ 0.841 \le |x| < 1.
\end{cases}$$

For small deformations the Arruda–Boyce model reduces to the Gaussian network based neo-Hookean solid model. It can be shown that the Gent model is a simple and accurate approximation of the Arruda–Boyce model.

== Alternative expressions for the Arruda–Boyce model ==
An alternative form of the Arruda–Boyce model, using the first five terms of the inverse Langevin function, is

$$W = C_1\left[\tfrac{1}{2}(I_1-3) + \tfrac{1}{20N}(I_1^2 -9) + \tfrac{11}{1050N^2}(I_1^3-27) + \tfrac{19}{7000N^3}(I_1^4-81) + \tfrac{519}{673750N^4}(I_1^5-243)\right]$$

where $C_1$ is a material constant. The quantity $N$ can also be interpreted as a measure of the limiting network stretch.

If $\lambda_m$ is the stretch at which the polymer chain network becomes locked, we can express the Arruda–Boyce strain energy density as

$$W = C_1\left[\tfrac{1}{2}(I_1-3) + \tfrac{1}{20\lambda_m^2}(I_1^2 -9) + \tfrac{11}{1050\lambda_m^4}(I_1^3-27) + \tfrac{19}{7000\lambda_m^6}(I_1^4-81) + \tfrac{519}{673750\lambda_m^8}(I_1^5-243)\right]$$

We may alternatively express the Arruda–Boyce model in the form

$$W = C_1~\sum_{i=1}^5 \alpha_i~\beta^{i-1}~(I_1^i-3^i)$$

where $\beta := \tfrac{1}{N} = \tfrac{1}{\lambda_m^2}$ and $\alpha_1 := \tfrac{1}{2} ~;~~ \alpha_2 := \tfrac{1}{20} ~;~~ \alpha_3 := \tfrac{11}{1050} ~;~~ \alpha_4 := \tfrac{19}{7000} ~;~~ \alpha_5 := \tfrac{519}{673750}.$

If the rubber is compressible, a dependence on $J=\det(\boldsymbol{F})$ can be introduced into the strain energy density; $\boldsymbol{F}$ being the deformation gradient. Several possibilities exist, among which the Kaliske–Rothert extension has been found to be reasonably accurate. With that extension, the Arruda-Boyce strain energy density function can be expressed as

$$W = D_1\left(\tfrac{J^2-1}{2} - \ln J\right) + C_1~\sum_{i=1}^5 \alpha_i~\beta^{i-1}~(\overline{I}_1^i-3^i)$$

where $D_1$ is a material constant and $\overline{I}_1 = {I}_1 J^{-2/3}$ . For consistency with linear elasticity, we must have $D_1 = \tfrac{\kappa}{2}$ where $\kappa$ is the bulk modulus.

== Consistency condition ==
For the incompressible Arruda–Boyce model to be consistent with linear elasticity, with $\mu$ as the shear modulus of the material, the following condition has to be satisfied:

$$\cfrac{\partial W}{\partial I_1}\biggr|_{I_1=3}  = \frac{\mu}{2} \,.$$

From the Arruda–Boyce strain energy density function, we have,

$$\cfrac{\partial W}{\partial I_1} = C_1~\sum_{i=1}^5 i~\alpha_i~\beta^{i-1}~I_1^{i-1} \,.$$

Therefore, at $I_1 = 3$,

$$\mu = 2C_1~\sum_{i=1}^5 i\,\alpha_i~\beta^{i-1}~I_1^{i-1} \,.$$

Substituting in the values of $\alpha_i$ leads to the consistency condition

$$\mu = C_1\left(1 + \tfrac{3}{5\lambda_m^2} + \tfrac{99}{175\lambda_m^4} + \tfrac{513}{875\lambda_m^6} + \tfrac{42039}{67375\lambda_m^8}\right) \,.$$

== Stress-deformation relations ==
The Cauchy stress for the incompressible Arruda–Boyce model is given by

$$\boldsymbol{\sigma}  = -p~\boldsymbol{\mathit{1}} +
2~\cfrac{\partial W}{\partial I_1}~\boldsymbol{B}
= -p~\boldsymbol{\mathit{1}} + 2C_1~\left[\sum_{i=1}^5 i~\alpha_i~\beta^{i-1}~I_1^{i-1}\right]\boldsymbol{B}$$

=== Uniaxial extension ===
Stress-strain curves under uniaxial extension for Arruda–Boyce model compared with various hyperelastic material models.

For uniaxial extension in the $\mathbf{n}_1$-direction, the principal stretches are $\lambda_1 = \lambda,~ \lambda_2=\lambda_3$. From incompressibility $\lambda_1~\lambda_2~\lambda_3=1$. Hence $\lambda_2^2=\lambda_3^2=1/\lambda$. Therefore,

$$I_1 = \lambda_1^2+\lambda_2^2+\lambda_3^2 = \lambda^2 + \cfrac{2}{\lambda} ~.$$

The left Cauchy–Green deformation tensor can then be expressed as

$$\boldsymbol{B} = \lambda^2~\mathbf{n}_1\otimes\mathbf{n}_1 + \cfrac{1}{\lambda}~(\mathbf{n}_2\otimes\mathbf{n}_2+\mathbf{n}_3\otimes\mathbf{n}_3) ~.$$

If the directions of the principal stretches are oriented with the coordinate basis vectors, we have

$$\begin{align}
\sigma_{11} & = -p + 2C_1\lambda^2\left[\sum_{i=1}^5 i~\alpha_i~\beta^{i-1}~I_1^{i-1}\right] \\
\sigma_{22} & = -p + \cfrac{2C_1}{\lambda}\left[\sum_{i=1}^5 i~\alpha_i~\beta^{i-1}~I_1^{i-1}\right] = \sigma_{33} ~.
\end{align}$$

If $\sigma_{22} = \sigma_{33} = 0$, we have

$$p =  \cfrac{2C_1}{\lambda}\left[\sum_{i=1}^5 i~\alpha_i~\beta^{i-1}~I_1^{i-1}\right]~.$$

Therefore,

$$\sigma_{11} = 2C_1\left(\lambda^2 - \cfrac{1}{\lambda}\right)\left[\sum_{i=1}^5 i~\alpha_i~\beta^{i-1}~I_1^{i-1}\right]~.$$

The engineering strain is $\lambda-1\,$. The engineering stress is

$$T_{11} = \sigma_{11}/\lambda =
2C_1\left(\lambda - \cfrac{1}{\lambda^2}\right)\left[\sum_{i=1}^5 i~\alpha_i~\beta^{i-1}~I_1^{i-1}\right]~.$$

=== Equibiaxial extension ===
For equibiaxial extension in the $\mathbf{n}_1$ and $\mathbf{n}_2$ directions, the principal stretches are $\lambda_1 = \lambda_2 = \lambda\,$. From incompressibility $\lambda_1~\lambda_2~\lambda_3=1$. Hence $\lambda_3=1/\lambda^2\,$. Therefore,

$$I_1 = \lambda_1^2+\lambda_2^2+\lambda_3^2 = 2~\lambda^2 + \cfrac{1}{\lambda^4} ~.$$

The left Cauchy–Green deformation tensor can then be expressed as

$$\boldsymbol{B} = \lambda^2~\mathbf{n}_1\otimes\mathbf{n}_1 + \lambda^2~\mathbf{n}_2\otimes\mathbf{n}_2+ \cfrac{1}{\lambda^4}~\mathbf{n}_3\otimes\mathbf{n}_3 ~.$$

If the directions of the principal stretches are oriented with the coordinate basis vectors, we have

$$\sigma_{11} = 2C_1\left(\lambda^2 - \cfrac{1}{\lambda^4}\right)\left[\sum_{i=1}^5 i~\alpha_i~\beta^{i-1}~I_1^{i-1}\right] = \sigma_{22} ~.$$

The engineering strain is $\lambda-1\,$. The engineering stress is

$$T_{11} = \cfrac{\sigma_{11}}{\lambda} =
2C_1\left(\lambda - \cfrac{1}{\lambda^5}\right)\left[\sum_{i=1}^5 i~\alpha_i~\beta^{i-1}~I_1^{i-1}\right] = T_{22}~.$$

=== Planar extension ===
Planar extension tests are carried out on thin specimens which are constrained from deforming in one direction. For planar extension in the $\mathbf{n}_1$ directions with the $\mathbf{n}_3$ direction constrained, the principal stretches are $\lambda_1=\lambda, ~\lambda_3=1$. From incompressibility $\lambda_1~\lambda_2~\lambda_3=1$. Hence $\lambda_2=1/\lambda\,$. Therefore,

$$I_1 = \lambda_1^2+\lambda_2^2+\lambda_3^2 = \lambda^2 + \cfrac{1}{\lambda^2} + 1 ~.$$

The left Cauchy–Green deformation tensor can then be expressed as

$$\boldsymbol{B} = \lambda^2~\mathbf{n}_1\otimes\mathbf{n}_1 + \cfrac{1}{\lambda^2}~\mathbf{n}_2\otimes\mathbf{n}_2+ \mathbf{n}_3\otimes\mathbf{n}_3 ~.$$

If the directions of the principal stretches are oriented with the coordinate basis vectors, we have

$$\sigma_{11} = 2C_1\left(\lambda^2 - \cfrac{1}{\lambda^2}\right)\left[\sum_{i=1}^5 i~\alpha_i~\beta^{i-1}~I_1^{i-1}\right] ~;~~ \sigma_{22} = 0 ~;~~ \sigma_{33} = 2C_1\left(1 - \cfrac{1}{\lambda^2}\right)\left[\sum_{i=1}^5 i~\alpha_i~\beta^{i-1}~I_1^{i-1}\right]~.$$

The engineering strain is $\lambda-1\,$. The engineering stress is

$$T_{11} = \cfrac{\sigma_{11}}{\lambda} =
2C_1\left(\lambda - \cfrac{1}{\lambda^3}\right)\left[\sum_{i=1}^5 i~\alpha_i~\beta^{i-1}~I_1^{i-1}\right]~.$$

=== Simple shear ===
The deformation gradient for a simple shear deformation has the form

$$\boldsymbol{F} = \boldsymbol{1} + \gamma~\mathbf{e}_1\otimes\mathbf{e}_2$$

where $\mathbf{e}_1,\mathbf{e}_2$ are reference orthonormal basis vectors in the plane of deformation and the shear deformation is given by

$$\gamma = \lambda - \cfrac{1}{\lambda} ~;~~ \lambda_1 = \lambda ~;~~ \lambda_2 = \cfrac{1}{\lambda} ~;~~ \lambda_3 = 1$$

In matrix form, the deformation gradient and the left Cauchy–Green deformation tensor may then be expressed as

$$\boldsymbol{F} = \begin{bmatrix} 1 & \gamma & 0 \\ 0 & 1 & 0 \\ 0 & 0 & 1 \end{bmatrix} ~;~~
\boldsymbol{B} = \boldsymbol{F}\cdot\boldsymbol{F}^T = \begin{bmatrix} 1+\gamma^2 & \gamma & 0 \\ \gamma & 1 & 0 \\ 0 & 0 & 1 \end{bmatrix}$$

Therefore,

$$I_1 = \mathrm{tr}(\boldsymbol{B}) = 3 + \gamma^2$$

and the Cauchy stress is given by

$$\boldsymbol{\sigma} = -p~\boldsymbol{\mathit{1}} + 2C_1\left[\sum_{i=1}^5 i~\alpha_i~\beta^{i-1}~(3+\gamma^2)^{i-1}\right]~\boldsymbol{B}$$

== Statistical mechanics of polymer deformation ==
The Arruda–Boyce model is based on the statistical mechanics of polymer chains. In this approach, each macromolecule is described as a chain of $N$ segments, each of length $l$. If we assume that the initial configuration of a chain can be described by a random walk, then the initial chain length is

$$r_0 = l\sqrt{N}$$

If we assume that one end of the chain is at the origin, then the probability that a block of size $dx_1 dx_2 dx_3$ around the origin will contain the other end of the chain, $(x_1,x_2,x_3)$, assuming a Gaussian probability density function, is

$$p(x_1,x_2,x_3) = \cfrac{b^3}{\pi^{3/2}}~\exp[-b^2(x_1^2 + x_2^2 + x_3^2)] ~;~~ b := \sqrt{\cfrac{3}{2Nl^2}}$$

The configurational entropy of a single chain from Boltzmann statistical mechanics is

$$s = c -k_B b^2 r^2$$

where $c$ is a constant. The total entropy in a network of $n$ chains is therefore

$$\Delta S = -\tfrac{1}{2} n k_B (\lambda_1^2 + \lambda_2^2 + \lambda_3^2 - 3) = -\tfrac{1}{2} n k_B (I_1-3)$$

where an affine deformation has been assumed. Therefore the strain energy of the deformed network is

$$W = -\theta \, dS = \tfrac{1}{2} n k_B \theta (I_1-3)$$

where $\theta$ is the temperature.

== See also ==
- Rubber elasticity
- Finite strain theory
- Continuum mechanics
- Neo-Hookean solid
- Mooney–Rivlin solid
- Yeoh (hyperelastic model)
- Gent (hyperelastic model)
