= International Women in Biomechanics =

Not-for-profit organization

- Formation: July, 2020
- Website: https://www.intwomenbiomech.org/

International Women in Biomechanics or the IWB is a not-for-profit organisation aimed at supporting gender equity in biomechanics and it aims to be a supportive and uplifting community for women and underrepresented genders in the field.

They have a membership of over 700 biomechanists from over 300 universities and organisations from 33 countries. The community contains ranges of career stages and professions and interacts through forums, meetings and social media.

== About ==
The IWB was founded in July 2020 to support women in the biomechanics field and it creation was exacerbated by the COVID-19 Pandemic which increased professional isolation. It was formed by two postdoctoral fellows, Anahid (Ana) Ebrahimi, who is based in the US, and Jayishni Maharaj, who is based in Australia. Ebrahimi and Maharaj were interviewed on the Biomechanics On Our Minds (BOOM) podcast about establishing IWB.

In 2021 they conducted a survey to identify the needs, concerns and issues faced by their community and found that the primary needs for women in biomechanics were; supportive working environments, career planning support and assistance in addressing workplace gender bias. In response to this the IWB identified three key areas to support its mission:

- Member support
- Community outreach
- Empowering allyship

The IWB has been an affiliate society of the International Society of Biomechanics since August 2023 and recipient of the American Society of Biomechanics 2022 Grants for Diversity, Equity, and Inclusion (GRADE) award.

The IWB are a sponsor of The Biomechanics Initiative grant program to support outreach for women in biomechanics
