= Chet Moritz =

American neural engineer

Chet T. Moritz
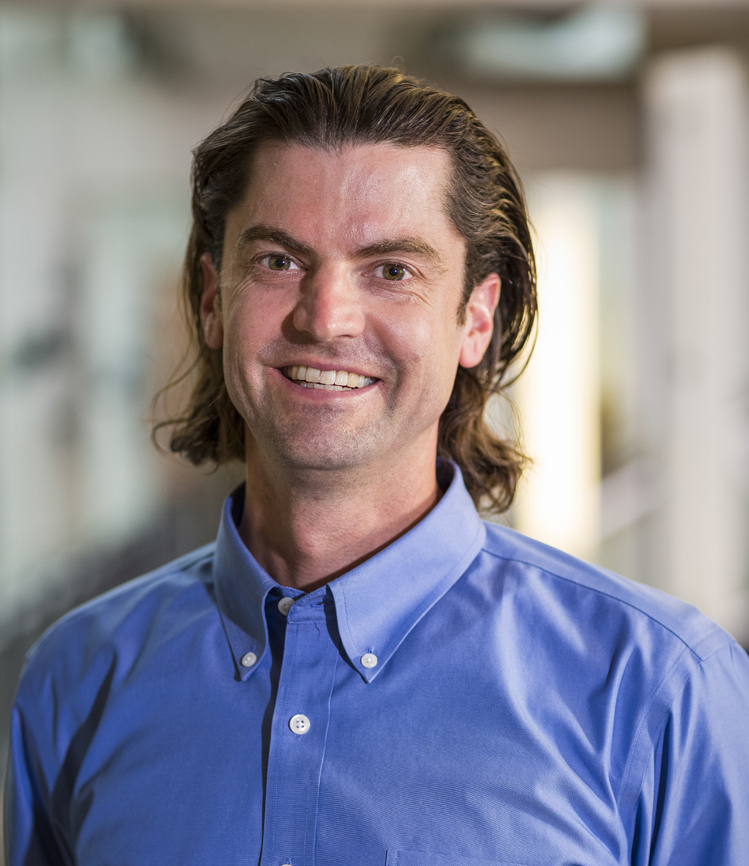
- Occupations: Neural engineer, neuroscientist, physiologist, academic and researcher
- Title: Cherng Jia and Elizabeth Yun Hwang Endowed Professorship of Spinal Cord Injury Research
- Awards: EUREKA Award, National Institutes of Health; Young Faculty Award, Defense Advanced Research Projects Agency (DARPA); Allen Distinguished Investigator, Paul G. Allen Family Foundation; International Research Consortium on Spinal Cord Injury, Christopher & Dana Reeve Foundation

Academic background
- Education: B.S., Zoology; Ph.D., Integrative Biology
- Alma mater: University of Washington; University of California, Berkeley

Academic work
- Institutions: University of Washington

Chet T. Moritz is an American neural engineer, neuroscientist, physiologist, and academic researcher. He is a Professor of Electrical and Computer Engineering, and holds joint appointments in the School of Medicine departments of Rehabilitation Medicine, and Physiology & Biophysics at the University of Washington.

Moritz's research is focused on neurotechnology including stimulation to restore function after brain and spinal cord injury. His work also includes brain-computer interfaces to control muscle and spinal stimulation. His discoveries have been featured in Nature, MSNBC national news, Wired, Popular Mechanics and local TV news and community outreach videos. He has also been quoted in the New York Times, Newsweek, Scientific American, Forbes, and Science News, and in a news story by Nature.

== Education ==
Moritz graduated with a bachelor's degree in Zoology from the University of Washington in 1998. He then enrolled at the University of California, Berkeley, and earned his Doctoral Degree in Integrative Biology in 2003. From 2003 till 2004, he served as a Postdoctoral Fellow of Integrative Physiology at the University of Colorado, and subsequently rejoined the University of Washington as a Senior Fellow.

== Career ==
Following his Postdoctoral fellowship, Moritz joined the faculty at the University of Washington as a Research Assistant Professor in the Department of Physiology & Biophysics in 2009, and was promoted to Assistant Professor of Rehabilitation Medicine in 2010. Along with this appointment, he held secondary appointments as assistant professor in the Department of Physiology and Biophysics. He was promoted to Associate Professor in 2014, and later joined the Department of Electrical & Computer Engineering in 2018. Since 2010, he has been a member of the Graduate Faculty, and a mentor for the Neuroscience Graduate Program.

== Research ==
Moritz has worked in the area of neurotechnology, neuromodulation, brain-computer interfaces, and home rehabilitation physical therapy.

=== Brain computer interfaces ===
Moritz conducted a study in 2008 demonstrating that a brain-computer interface can be used to control stimulation of paralyzed muscles and restore movement. This has spawned several successful human trials of this concept in people with spinal cord injury. With Alik Widge, Moritz also demonstrated that cognitive areas of the pre-frontal cortex could be used to limbic stimulation paving the way for psychiatric neuroprostheses and an allowed patent. With David Bjanes, Moritz demonstrated a new way to provide sensory feedback directly to the brain.

=== Neurotechnology ===
Moritz's team demonstrated that stimulation of the spinal cord could lead to lasting improvements in hand and arm function that persisted beyond stimulation. This demonstration of 'engineered neuroplasticity' paved the way for human trials of spinal cord stimulation. He and Fatma Inanici's recent studies regarding transcutaneous spinal cord stimulation indicate that non-invasive transcutaneous electrical stimulation of the spinal networks is very effective in restoring movement and function of the hands and arm for people with both complete paralysis and long-term spinal cord injury. This work lead directly to a multi-site clinical trial with ONWARD medical, for which Moritz serves as one of two co-PIs for the study. Parallel work is also exploring optogenetic stimulation of the spinal cord with collaborators Polina Anikeeva and Sarah Mondello.

=== Motor unit physiology and biomechanics ===
In his studies of motor unit physiology, Moritz focused on experimentally measured force variability across a wide range of forces to improve the ability of a motor unit model to predict steadiness in the hand. He also published a paper in 2004 demonstrating the contributions of feed-forward anticipation and neuro-mechanical reaction when humans encounter surprise, expected, and random changes from a soft elastic surface to a hard surface underfoot. Furthermore, he studied implications regarding muscle pre-stretch and elastic energy storage in locomotion.

=== Home rehabilitation ===
Moritz and colleagues demonstrated that surface electromyography (sEMG) can be used to control a therapy video game using activation of weak or spastic muscles. Termed NeuroGame Therapy (NGT), the team showed improve wrist control in children with cerebral palsy (CP) and tested the approach in older adults following stroke.

== Awards and honors ==
- 2003 - President's Award, American Society of Biomechanics
- 2009 - EUREKA Award, National Institutes of Health
- 2012 - Young Faculty Award, Defense Advanced Research Projects Agency (DARPA)
- 2013 -2018 - Allen Distinguished Investigator, Paul G. Allen Family Foundation
- 2015 -2018 - International Research Consortium on Spinal Cord Injury, Christopher and Dana Reeve Foundation
- 2020 - Weill Neurohub Investigator, Weill Neurohub at UCSF, Berkeley and U. Washington

== Bibliography ==
- Moritz, C. T., Barry, B. K., Pascoe, M. A., & Enoka, R. M. (2005). Discharge rate variability influences the variation in force fluctuations across the working range of a hand muscle. Journal of Neurophysiology, 93(5), 2449–2459.
- Moritz, C. T., Perlmutter, S. I., & Fetz, E. E. (2008). Direct control of paralysed muscles by cortical neurons. Nature, 456(7222), 639–642.
- Kasten, M. R., Sunshine, M. D., & Moritz, C. T. (2012). Cervical intraspinal microstimulation improves forelimb motor recovery after spinal contusion injury. International Functional Electrical Stimulation Society.
- Widge, A. S., & Moritz, C. T. (2014). Pre-frontal control of closed-loop limbic neurostimulation by rodents using a brain–computer interface. Journal of neural engineering, 11(2), 024001.
- Inanici, F., Samejima, S., Gad, P., Edgerton, V. R., Hofstetter, C. P., & Moritz, C. T. (2018). Transcutaneous electrical spinal stimulation promotes long-term recovery of upper extremity function in chronic tetraplegia. IEEE Transactions on Neural Systems and Rehabilitation Engineering, 26(6), 1272–1278.
- Bjånes, D. A., & Moritz, C. T. (2019). A robust encoding scheme for delivering artificial sensory information via direct brain stimulation. IEEE Transactions on Neural Systems and Rehabilitation Engineering, 27(10), 1994–2004.
- Inanici, F., Brighton, L. N., Samejima, S., Hofstetter, C. P., & Moritz, C. T. (2021). Transcutaneous spinal cord stimulation restores hand and arm function after spinal cord injury. IEEE Transactions on Neural Systems and Rehabilitation Engineering, 29, 310–319.
- Samejima, S., Khorasani, A., Ranganathan, V., Nakahara, J., Tolley, N. M., Boissenin, A., ... & Moritz, C. T. (2021). Brain-Computer-Spinal Interface Restores Upper Limb Function After Spinal Cord Injury. IEEE Transactions on Neural Systems and Rehabilitation Engineering, 29, 1233–1242.
