= Scott L. Delp =

American academic

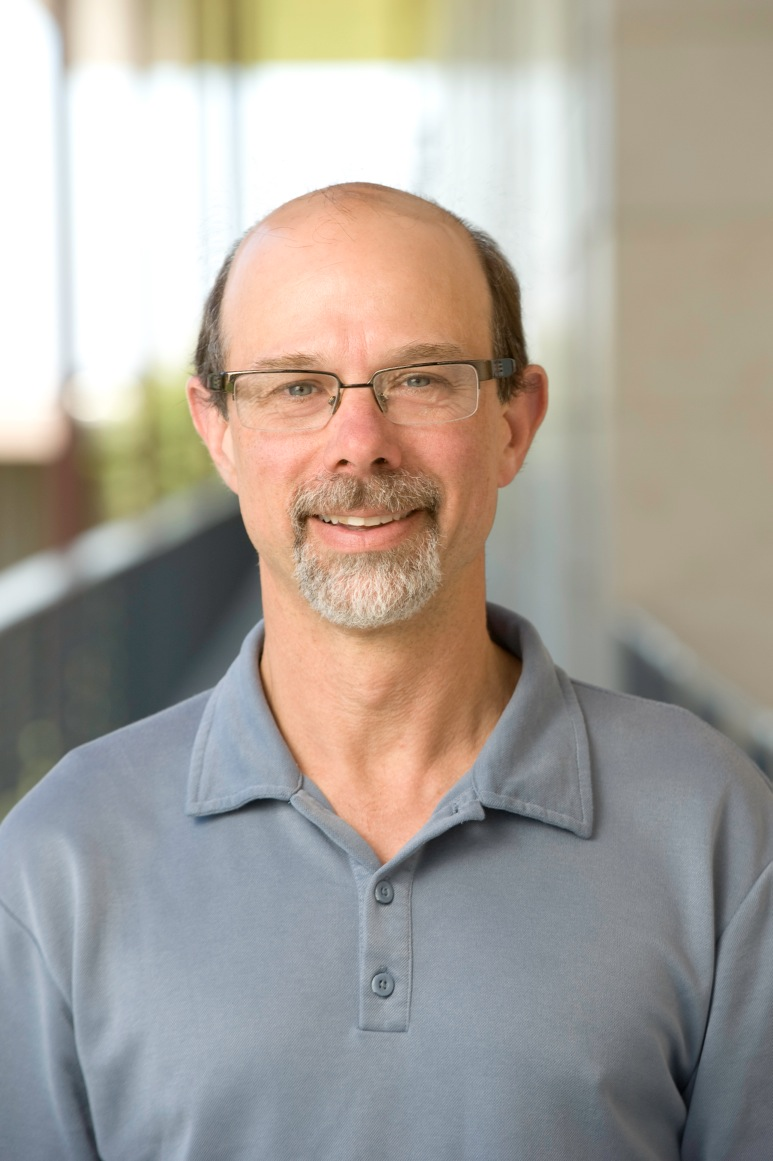
Delp in 2010

Scott L. Delp is an American academic who is the James H. Clark Professor of Bioengineering and Mechanical Engineering at Stanford University. He is the Founding Chairman of the Department of Bioengineering at Stanford, the Director of the National Center for Simulation in Rehabilitation Research (NCSRR), Simbios, and the NIH Center for Physics-Based Simulations of Biological Structures at Stanford.

Delp developed the OpenSim software for biomechanical simulation. He also invented technology for surgical navigation that is now in wide clinical use. Together with Mark Schnitzer and their students, Delp developed novel microendoscopes that allow realtime in vivo imaging of human muscle microstructure. Together with Karl Deisseroth, Delp pioneered the use of optogenetics to control activity in the peripheral nervous system leading to important inventions for treating paralysis, spasticity and pain.

Delp was elected as a member into the National Academy of Engineering in 2016 for computer simulations of human movement and their applications to treatment of clinical movement pathologies. He is also a Fellow, American Institute of Medical and Biological Engineering, American Society of Biomechanics, and American Society of Mechanical Engineers.
