= Roger M. Enoka =

Physiology professor

Roger M. Enoka Ph.D.
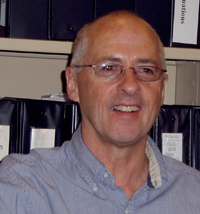
- Enoka at a lab journal club in 2008
- Born: Roger Maro Enoka; April 7, 1949 (age 77); Palmerston North, New Zealand
- Education: Dip. P.E. University of Otago; Dip. Teaching Christchurch Teachers' College; M.S. University of Washington; Ph.D. University of Washington; Postdoctoral Fellowship, University of Arizona
- Employer: University of Colorado Boulder
- Organization: Department of Integrative Physiology
- Known for: Biomechanics, Neuromechanics, Fatigue and Fatigability, Aging, Electromyography, Motor Control
- Title: Professor
- Awards: 2004 Presidential Lecture, American College of Sports Medicine 2011 Muybridge Award, International Society of Biomechanics 2018 Basmajian Award, International Society of Electrophysiology and Kinesiology 2018 Borelli Award, American Society of Biomechanics 2023 Doctorat Honoris Causa, Université de libre Bruxelles, Brussels, Belgium
- Website: https://www.colorado.edu/iphy/people/faculty/roger-m-enoka

Roger Maro Enoka (born April 7, 1949) is a New Zealand–born neuroscientist and biomechanist, currently Professor of Integrative Physiology at the University of Colorado Boulder, where he formerly served as department chair. His research focuses on the neural and muscular determinants of human motor control in health and disease.

He has authored hundreds of peer-reviewed articles, and has delivered major lectures internationally, including a Presidential Lecture at the American College of Sports Medicine in 2004, the Muybridge Keynote lecture at the International Society of Biomechanics (2011), the Borelli Award lecture at the American Society of Biomechanics (2018), and the Basmajian Award lecture at the International Society of Electrophysiology and Kinesiology (2018). He is a Fellow of the American Society of Biomechanics.

== Early life and education ==
Roger Maro Enoka was born in Palmerston North, New Zealand, on April 7, 1949. He received a Diploma of Physical Education from the University of Otago (1970) and a Diploma of Teaching from Christchurch Teachers' College. After teaching at Rongotai College in Wellington from 1971 to 1974, he moved to the United States to pursue graduate study at the University of Washington, where he earned an M.S. in 1976 (in biomechanics of human movement) and a Ph.D. in 1981 (in kinesiology / human movement science). Subsequently, he completed postdoctoral training in neurophysiology at the University of Arizona (1981-1985).

== Academic career ==
After completing a Ph.D., Enoka joined the University of Arizona in 1981 as an Assistant Professor in the Department of Exercise & Sport Sciences and concurrently held an appointment in the Department of Physiology (1986–1990). He was promoted to Associate Professor in 1987 and Professor in 1992. From 1993 to 1996 he served as Staff Scientist in the Department of Biomedical Engineering at the Cleveland Clinic Foundation.

In 1996, Enoka moved to the University of Colorado Boulder as Professor in the Department of Kinesiology & Applied Physiology. He served as Chair of that department (2001–2003), In 2003, the department was reorganized, and he became Professor and Chair of the new Department of Integrative Physiology, serving as chair through 2014. He also served as an interim Chair in the Department of Mathematics at the University of Colorado Boulder (2016-2017).

He holds adjunct (or adjunct professor) appointments at the University of Colorado Anschutz, in Geriatrics (since 2003) and Neurology (since 2011). Over his career Dr. Enoka has been active in several professional societies, including serving as president of the American Society of Biomechanics (1989–1990) and editor-in-chief of the journal Exercise and Sport Sciences Reviews (2013-2023) for the American College of Sports Medicine.

== Research contributions and scientific work ==
=== Research interests and themes ===
Enoka's research centers on the neuromuscular determinants of motor function in humans, with particular emphasis on the control of muscle force by the nervous system. His work focuses on the function of the basic control unit (motor unit), which comprises a nerve cell in the spinal cord and the muscle fibers it innervates. The movements we perform during activities of daily living are controlled by modulating the activity of populations of motor units.

Much of his work is based on the framework provided by the NIH Toolbox, which comprises four domains (motor, emotion, sensation, and cognition) used to evaluate human health and function across the lifespan. He measures applied forces and uses electromyography (EMG) to explain differences in performance between groups of study participants on tests of balance, dexterity, endurance, locomotion, and strength. His studies have compared the performance of young, middle-aged, and older adults and clinical populations with healthy control participants.

Based on EMG electrodes that record multiple channels of motor unit activity at the same time, Enoka and others use the electrical signals to probe connectivity among neurons within the spinal cord. This work characterizes the structure and function of neural modules created by the nervous system to simplify the control of movement.

=== Key contributions ===
Enoka is the author of Neuromechanical Basis of Kinesiology, first published in 1988 by Human Kinetics, a textbook that has been widely used in kinesiology and motor control education. With this book, Enoka introduced the word "neuromechanics" to integrate his interests in neurophysiology and biomechanics into the study of human movement. The 6th edition of the book was published in 2024.

Among Enoka's most-cited publication is the 1992 invited review "Neurobiology of Muscle Fatigue" in the Journal of Applied Physiology, which remains a fundamental reference in the field. This paper laid the foundation for subsequent work on the distinction between fatigue and fatigability and its translation to human performance.

In collaboration with C. J. Heckman, Enoka authored a 2012 review on the motor unit in Comprehensive Physiology, bringing together work on preclinical models and humans to advance basic knowledge on motor unit function.

In 2021, Enoka authored a chapter in the 6th edition of Principles of Neural Science. The chapter is titled "The motor unit and muscle action."

He pioneered work on the functional significance of the fluctuations in an applied force during submaximal isometric contractions. When quantified as the coefficient of variation for force, the normalized fluctuations provide a measure of force steadiness and indicate the accuracy of force control. Even when assessed during submaximal isometric contractions, measures of force steadiness often explain significant amounts of the variance in performance on tests of motor function in the NIH Toolbox.

One of his key findings on aging has been to emphasize the absence of significant associations between declines in physical function and chronological age. This work suggests caution in inferring the physical capabilities of an individual based on chronological age.

=== Impact and recognition ===
According to his curriculum vitae, as of 2025 Enoka supervised dozens of doctoral and postdoctoral scholars and contributed to the training of multiple scientists in the neural control of human movement. He has been honored with invited lectures and awards (Muybridge Award, Borelli Award, Basmajian Lecture), and is a Fellow of the American Society of Biomechanics.

As of October 2025, Enoka's Google Scholar profile reports approximately 48,000 citations and an h-index of 109, reflecting the broad influence of his work in neuromuscular physiology.

== Honors and awards / invited lectures ==
=== Honors and awards ===
- President, American Society of Biomechanics (1989–1990)
- Inducted into the University of Otago, School of Physical Education Wall of Fame (2010)
- Muybridge Award (International Society of Biomechanics) 2011
- Fellow, American Society of Biomechanics (2012)
- Borelli Award, American Society of Biomechanics (2018)
- Doctorate Honoris Causa, Université libre de Bruxelles (2023)

=== Invited lectures ===
- 2004 Presidential Lecture, Indianapolis, Indiana, American College of Sports Medicine
- Muybridge Lecture, International Society of Biomechanics, Brussels, Belgium (2011)
- Basmajian Lecture, International Society of Electrophysiology and Kinesiology, Dublin, Ireland (2018)

== Mentorship and legacy ==
Over his career, Enoka has mentored numerous doctoral students, postdoctoral fellows, and visiting scholars, many of whom have gone on to academic or research careers in neuromuscular physiology and rehabilitation science. Notable trainees include Jayne Garland, Andrew Fuglevand, John Semmler, Sandra Hunter, Evangelos Christou, Minoru Shinohara, Chet Moritz, Stéphane Baudry, and Mélanie Henry. His key international collaborators include Jacques Duchateau (Brussels, Belgium), Dario Farina (London, UK), Alessandro Del Vecchio (Erlangen-Nürnberg, Germany), and Ioannis Amiridis (Thessaloniki, Greece).

== Most highly cited publications ==
- Enoka, RM; Stuart, DG (1992). "Neurobiology of muscle fatigue". Journal of Applied Physiology. 72 (5): 1631–48. doi:10.1152/jappl.1992.72.5.1631. PMID 1601767.
- Enoka, Roger M.; Duchateau, Jacques (2008-01-01). "Muscle fatigue: what, why and how it influences muscle function". The Journal of Physiology. 586 (1): 11–23. doi:10.1113/jphysiol.2007.139477. ISSN 0022-3751. PMC 2375565. PMID 17702815.
- Farina, Dario; Merletti, Roberto; Enoka, Roger M. (April 2004). "The extraction of neural strategies from the surface EMG". Journal of Applied Physiology. 96 (4): 1486–1495. doi:10.1152/japplphysiol.01070.2003. ISSN 8750-7587. PMID 15016793.
- Kluger, Benzi M.; Krupp, Lauren B.; Enoka, Roger M. (2013-01-22). "Fatigue and fatigability in neurologic illnesses: proposal for a unified taxonomy". Neurology. 80 (4): 409–416. doi:10.1212/WNL.0b013e31827f07be. ISSN 1526-632X. PMC 3589241. PMID 23339207.
- Enoka, Roger M.; Duchateau, Jacques (2016). "Translating Fatigue to Human Performance". Medicine & Science in Sports & Exercise. 48 (11): 2228–2238. doi:10.1249/MSS.0000000000000929. PMC 5035715. PMID 27015386.
- Enoka, R. M. (December 1996). "Eccentric contractions require unique activation strategies by the nervous system". Journal of Applied Physiology. 81 (6): 2339–2346. doi:10.1152/jappl.1996.81.6.2339. ISSN 8750-7587. PMID 9018476.
- Enoka, R. M. (September 1988). "Muscle strength and its development. New perspectives". Sports Medicine. 6 (3): 146–168. doi:10.2165/00007256-198806030-00003. ISSN 0112-1642. PMID 3055145.
- Enoka, Roger M.; Christou, Evangelos A.; Hunter, Sandra K.; Kornatz, Kurt W.; Semmler, John G.; Taylor, Anna M.; Tracy, Brian L. (February 2003). "Mechanisms that contribute to differences in motor performance between young and old adults". Journal of Electromyography and Kinesiology. 13 (1): 1–12. doi:10.1016/s1050-6411(02)00084-6. ISSN 1050-6411. PMID 12488083.
- Heckman, C.J.; Enoka, Roger M. (2012). "Motor Unit". Comprehensive Physiology. 2 (4): 2629–2682. doi:10.1002/j.2040-4603.2012.tb00465.x. PMID 23720261.
