= OpenSim =

OpenSim may refer to one of several software packages/platforms:

- OpenSim (simulation toolkit), biomechanics simulation software from the National Centers for Biomedical Computing at Stanford University
- OpenSimulator, an open source project to develop virtual worlds similar to Second Life
