= Vijay Goel =

Vijay Goel may refer to:

- Vijay Goel (politician) (born 1954), Indian politician
- Vijay K. Goel, American engineer
