= Ellen Arruda =

American mechanical engineer

Ellen Marie Arruda is an American mechanical engineer known for her research on the mechanical properties of polymers and on tissue engineering, with applications including the design of improved football helmets, artificial tooth enamel that can withstand high-shock and high-vibration environments, and nanolayered composite materials that are lightweight, as strong as steel, and transparent. The Arruda–Boyce model for the behavior of rubber-like polymers is named for her and her doctoral advisor Mary Cunningham Boyce, with whom she published it in 1993. She is the Maria Comninou Collegiate Professor of Mechanical Engineering and Tim Manganello/BorgWarner Department Chair of Mechanical Engineering at the University of Michigan.

== Education and career ==
Arruda earned bachelor's in engineering, S. with Honors followed by her master's at Pennsylvania State University in 1985 and 1988, and completed a Ph.D. in mechanical engineering at the Massachusetts Institute of Technology in 1992. Her dissertation, Characterization of the Strain Hardening Response of Amorphous Polymers, was supervised by Mary Cunningham Boyce.

She joined the University of Michigan Department of Mechanical Engineering and Applied Mechanics and Department of Macromolecular Science and Engineering as an assistant professor in 1992, became a full professor in 2005, and added an affiliation as a professor in the Department of Biomedical Engineering in 2009. In 2018, she was named the new chair of the Department of Mechanical Engineering.

== Recognition ==
Arruda was named a Fellow of the American Society of Mechanical Engineers and of the Society of Engineering Science in 2008, and of the American Academy of Mechanics in 2010. She was elected to the National Academy of Engineering in 2017 "for pioneering research in polymer and tissue mechanics and their application in innovative commercial products".

She was the 2018 winner of the James R. Rice Medal of the Society of Engineering Science "for substantial contributions to the mechanics of engineering polymers and biological materials, with both fundamental and applied impact", the 2019 winner of the Nadai Medal of the American Society of Mechanical Engineers, and the 2023 winner of the American Society of Biomechanics Borelli award which recognizes outstanding career accomplishment.

She was elected to the 2022 Class of AIMBE College of Fellows, consisting of prominent medical and biological engineers across the country. She was selected for her Outstanding Contributions to the Understanding of Soft Issue and Biomechanics including novel tissue engineered constructs for ligament and tendon replacement.
