= Mimi R. Koehl =

American marine biologist

Mimi A. R. Koehl
- Education: Gettysburg College and Duke University
- Awards: MacArthur Fellows Program
- Scientific career
- Fields: Marine biology
- Doctoral advisor: Stephen A. Wainwright

Mimi A. R. Koehl is an American marine biologist, biomechanist, and professor in the Department of Integrative Biology at University of California, Berkeley, and head of the Koehl Lab. She is a MacArthur Fellow from the class of 1990

== Early life and education ==
Koehl grew up in Silver Spring, Maryland. Her father was a physics professor, from whom she learned math, and her mother was an artist who sold portrait paintings. Koehl has an older brother. As a child, she helped her father in his workshop, where she learned how to use tools.

M. A. R. Koehl enrolled at Gettysburg College as an art major, and switched to biology after taking a biology class as part of her degree requirements. She graduated from Gettysburg College magna cum laude, with a B.A. in biology. After graduation she worked at Woods Hole Oceanographic Institution as a lab technician for a summer. She began her studies at Duke University in the fall of 1970, where she studied under Stephen A. Wainwright and graduated with a Ph.D. in zoology. She was a Postdoctoral Fellow (1976-1977) at Friday Harbor Laboratories, University of Washington, where she studied with Richard R. Strathmann, and at University of York, where she studied with John Currey.

She was diagnosed with dyslexia in her mid-forties, and has talked about how it shaped the way she sees the world, and how it influenced her love for fluid mechanics and biology.

== Research ==
Koehl broadly studies how body structure and physical environment affect an organism's mechanical function in nature, looking across many levels of biological organization. Scientific techniques utilized in Koehl's laboratory range from fluid and solid mechanics to ecological quadrat sampling.

She has studied how marine larvae swim and feed in turbulent flows, and how organisms like kelp, seagrass and coral use currents and waves. Additionally, she has studied the role of hair-bearing appendages in swimming organisms, to both understand their role in propulsion and sensing.

== Selected publications ==
- Koehl, M.A.R. and M.G. Hadfield. 2004. "Soluble settlement cue in slowly-moving water within coral reefs induces larval adhesion to surfaces". J. Mar. Systems
- Koehl, M.A.R. 2004. "Biomechanics of microscopic appendages: Functional shifts caused by changes in speed". J. Biomech. 37:789-795.
- Koehl, M.A.R. 2003. "Physical modelling in biomechanics". Phil Trans. Roy. Soc. Lond. B 358:1589–1596.
- Koehl, M.A.R., J.R. Koseff, J.P. Crimaldi, M.G. McCay, T. Cooper, M.B. Wiley, and P.A. Moore. 2001. "Lobster sniffing: Antennule design and hydrodynamic filtering of information in an odor plume". Science 294:1948–1951
- Koehl, M.A.R., K.J. Quillin, and C. Pell. 2000. "Mechanical design of fiber-wound hydraulic skeletons: The stiffening and straightening of embryonic notochords". Am. Zool. 40:28-41.
- Koehl, M.A.R.. "The Fluid Mechanics of Arthropod Sniffing in Turbulent Odor Plumes", Chemical Senses 2006 31(2):93-105
- Koehl, M.A.R.. "A Life Outside". Annu. Rev. Mar. Sci. 2024. 16: 17.1–17.23

== Awards and honors ==
The Society of Integrative and Comparative Biology Division of Comparative Biomechanics has named the annual best student oral presentation the "Mimi A.R. Koehl and Steven Wainwright Award" .

- Member of the National Academy of Sciences
- Borelli Award, American Society of Biomechanics
- 1990 MacArthur Fellows Program
- Presidential Young Investigator Award, American Academy of Arts and Sciences
- John Simon Guggenheim Memorial Foundation Fellowship
- Fellow, California Academy of Sciences
- Phi Beta Kappa Visiting Scholar
- Rachel Carson Lecture, American Geophysical Union, 2006
- John Martin Award, American Society of Limnology and Oceanography
- Honorary Degree, Doctor of Science, Bates College
- Muybridge Award, International Society of Biomechanics
- The Graduate School Distinguished Alumni Award Duke University
- American Physical Society, Division of Fluid Dynamics Fellowship, 2018

== Outreach ==
She appeared on PBS Nova in the February 1980 episode "Living Machines". Her research has been featured extensively in the media, including Science News, Discover Magazine, Science, The New York Times, Scientific American, Duke Magazine ,

She has been featured and profiled in many other publications, including the series of children's book "Women's Adventures in Science", published by the National Academy of Sciences, the book "Agassiz's Legacy: Scientists' Reflections on the Value of Field Experience", written by Elizabeth Gladfelter, the book "Notable Women Scientists in the Life Sciences" by Shearer and Shearer, where she appears on the cover, and "Gifted Woman" by Schatz. She was also profiled in the Berkeleyan.
