= Physical oncology =

Physical oncology is the study of the physical/mechanical properties of cancerous tumors, and how they relate to their development and treatment. Generalisations of mechanical signals typically refer to stress fields and stress tensors.

== Cancerous tumors ==
Cancerous tumors (sometimes referred to as "solid tumors" by oncologists to differentiate them from hematological malignancies) are organs consisting of cancerous tissue surrounded by the extracellular matrix (ECM). The ECM is sometimes called stroma, chorion or connective tissue. (However, given that the cancer organ is isolated from this connective tissue system, the term ECM is preferred.)

=== Tissues of the cancer organ ===
==== ECM ====
The ECM consists of a mixture of cells (immune cells, fibroblasts, etc.) dispersed in proteins, most of them collagen which surrounds the tumor.

It is analogous to connective tissue and the basal cell membrane; a local condensation located below normal epithelia. This connective tissue allows oxygen and nutrients to diffuse to the epithelia, which are not vascularized.

In the tumor ECM, rapidly, beyond 1 mm^{3} of tumor is formed a network of blood vessels, the "neovascularization" (induced by neoangiogenesis) around the tumor and which will allow the diffusion of oxygen and nutrients in the cancer tissue itself, which is not vascularized.

==== Cancerous tissue ====
Cancerous tissues develop from "normal" tissues, via the cancerous transformation of epithelia; for example, breast cancer arises from a cancerous transformation of mammary glandular tissue. Cancerous tissue looks similar to the original tissue, and is said to be either more or less differentiated. Poorly-differentiated cancerous tissue has a microscopic appearance that differs from the original tissue. As a result, it is considered "poorly prognostic", will make more metastases, and will be more difficult to treat.

Epithelial cells are contiguous and polarized. More than 90% of cancers (including breast, prostate, colon/rectum, bronchi and pancreas cancer) arise from these epithelia after a long process of cancerization.

== The study of biological and mechanical signals ==
=== Differences between biological and physical signals ===
| | Support | Transmission of the signal | Modulation of the signal | Nature of the Signal | Action | Reversibility in space |
|---|---|---|---|---|---|---|
| Biological | Liquid Incompressible | Slow Step-by-step | Difficult | Biochemical | Slow | Unidirectional |
| Physical | Semisolid (20% of cell volume) Compressible | Fast Almost instantaneous | Easy | Mechanical | Fast | Bidirectional |

=== Comparison of input and output signals in different areas of biological study ===
| Area of Study | Input Signal | Output Signal |
|---|---|---|
| Biology | Biological | Biological |
| Mechanobiology | Mechanical | Biological |
| Physical Oncology | Mechanical | Mechanical |

Studies of mechanotransduction in mechanobiology apply mechanical input signals and analyse the subsequent biological output signals. As a result, many articles published in mechanobiology end with the phrase "we have defined a target to find a therapeutic molecule", which indicates a lack of therapeutic approaches based on the use of mechanical signals.

In comparison, physical oncology aims to study the effect of mechanical inputs on a mechanical outputs in relation to biological structures, which manifests in the study of tissue architecture.

== Definition of the tissue phenotype ==
The diagnosis of cancer is determined by microscopic analysis of a biopsy of the tumor. The phenotype of the cell is supposed to be the translation of the genotype expressed in a given cell, as well as of the environment; for example, a liver cell does not look like a pancreas cell, because it does not express the same genes (yet all present in the genome of all cells).

These characteristics are summarized by:

- differentiation,
- mitosis,
- apoptosis and
- cell death.

The pathologist will describe the biopsy based on these criteria.

The tissue phenotype can be described by a coefficient of fractality very strongly correlated with the prognosis and the components of the cellular phenotype. Thus, a high coefficient of fractality is correlated with a poorly differentiated tumor, with significant mitoses, little apoptosis, and a poor prognosis.

In oncology, the tissue phenotype is dominant over the cellular genotype.

== Development of cancerous tumor models ==
Physical oncology was made possible by technical developments that allowed in vitro - and later in vivo - models to more closely simulate cancerous tumors in patients.

Initially, 2D cell cultures in glass and plastic boxes were used. However, the cell cultures would adhere to the bottoms of these boxes due to the stiffness of their materials.

Later, 3D cultures were developed. These cultures consist of cells - which constitute multicellular spheres by dividing - surrounded by a gel-like culture medium at a Young's modulus close to that of the living and variable tissues. The choice of culture medium depends on, for example, the amount of collagen surrounding these cultures in 3D. Organoids and spheroids are variants of this type of culture. These 3D cultures are more realistic models that better simulate the clinical reality of cancerous tumors in patients. The culture medium surrounding the growing tumor tissue can be used as a "virtual ECM"; for example, the pressure around the tumor grown can be increased.

At the same time, the animal models evolved there also towards more similarity with the clinical reality. The human tumor xenograft is currently the standard, and the orthotopic transplant (e.g. the transplant of human pancreatic cancer tissue in a mouse pancreas) is considered an effective experimental model.

Xenografts can constitute a cancer organ across human and non-human tissues, even if the ECM is of animal origin.

=== In vitro models ===
The role of stress on the growth of a spheroid in vitro had already been shown by Gabriel Helminger, but the experiment of Matthew Paszek in 2005 gives a new dimension to this use of mechanical signals in vitro by showing the transition from a normal architecture of a breast acinus - the elementary unit of the mammary gland - to a cancerous architecture. Specifically, the surface tension is changed by increasing the concentration of collagen in the culture medium surrounding the tumor.

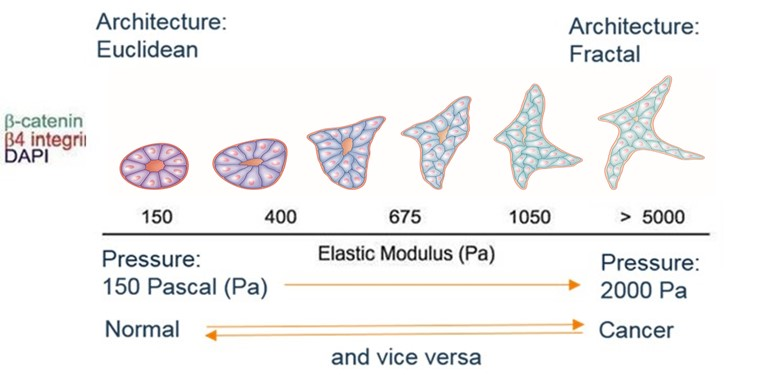
Transition between non-cancerous and cancerous tissue architectures.

This transition is progressive, and can be reversed if the constraint is relaxed. The shift in tissue phenotype is dictated by changes in the concentration of biological markers of cancerization (catenins, integrins, etc.) and the shrinking of the central cavity. This experiment opens the way to the reversibility of cancer, which is intended to replace conventional destructive approaches.

A similar experiment by Gautham Venugopalan ASCB, 2012 yielded similar observations:

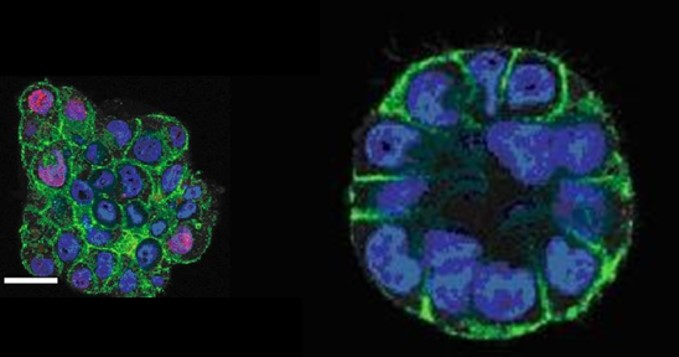
Malignant breast cells cultured in vitro in 3D form a "disorganized" mass with a fractal structure (left). After a few minutes of compression, they form a Euclidean acinus (right).

Other authors have extended this work on different models with different mechanical signals. F Montel et al., in particular, demonstrated on spheroids of human cancer origin a very significant increase in apoptosis in response to stress.

These 3D cultures have also shown the organization of collagen fibers within the ECM and beyond, which allow for remote transmission of mechanical signals and a 'tensor dialogue' between the tumor, ECM and normal environment.

However, all these experiments apply physical variables (surface tension, osmotic pressure, etc.) that cannot be manipulated in vivo.

=== Ex vivo models ===
M Plodinec et al. extended this work using ex vivo breast cancer biopsies that were analysed using atomic force microscopy. The Young's moduli of the different tissue components were measured for tumours both benign and malignant.

| Component | Young's modulus (kPa) |
|---|---|
| Non-cancerous tissues | 1.1 |
| Cancerous tissues | 0.8 |
| ECM | >2 |

In oncology, it is generally observed that cancerous tissues are generally softer than their non-cancerous counterparts, from the dysplastic cell to the tumor and metastatic cells.

The modulus of cancerous tissue is inversely correlated with the risk the tissue poses; the softer the tumor:

- the more it is undifferentiated,
- the more metastasis it will cause, and
- the less it will respond to current treatments.

=== In vivo models ===
For therapeutic purposes, R Brossel et al. (2016) showed the possibility of acting on a tumor grafted subcutaneously in rodents by applying a constraint.

The 3 control groups of mice consisted of those:

1. with particles and without gradient;
2. with gradient and without particles;
3. without gradient or particles.

Between the treated group and the control groups, the volume of the tumor measured in vivo very significantly decreased in the treated group compared to the control groups:

| Grafted mice group | Median tumor volume (mm^{3}) | Significance of the difference (p) |
|---|---|---|
| Treated group | 529 | p = 0.015 |
| Control groups | 1334 | p = 0.015 |

There was also a significant difference in favor of the treated group when measuring the surface of the living tumor (ex vivo) on digitized histological sections:

| Grafted mice group | Mean tumor area (mm^{2}) | Significance of the difference (p) |
|---|---|---|
| Treated group | 7.7 | p = 0.001 |
| Control groups | 23.1; 21.4; 26.8 | p = 0.001 |

This field imposed on the ECM is superimposed on that already present in the tumor tissue. This contrasts with observations in vitro, where there is no confinement by the ECM or anchoring by the integrins to ensure the physical continuity between the ECM and the tumor tissue and thus allow the propagation to distance of mechanical signals.

In this perspective, the "field of stress" becomes the therapeutic agent.

This stress is exerted via ferric (magnetizable) nanoparticles, located around (and not in) the tumor. A magnetic field gradient generated by fixed magnets is exerted onto these nanoparticles from outside the animal. The nanoparticles then act as bioactuators, transforming a fraction of the magnetic energy into mechanical energy.

Related to this study is the European project Imaging the Force of Cancer, which aimed to measure, voxel by voxel, the constraints involved within the tumoral tissue. It focused on the breast, the primitive liver and the brain.

This project was based on MRI elastography, which is the reference method for in vivo, in situ and non-perturbative measurement of the strain. Very small elastic strain applied in the tissue and the stress (i.e. the constraint) was measured. This method provided a basis for constructing the stress tensor of tumor tissue in vivo and in situ, without significant disturbance of patient tumors.

There is also an in vivo experiment which demonstrates the increase of the signals coming from the integrins, induced by the increase of the rigidity of the matrix.

== The isolated cell ==
=== Micropatterning ===
Cellular patterning allowed to show the dependence of cellular architecture on the tensions generated by their supports, which is variable according to the rigidity of these supports. This makes it possible to hypothesize about the transmission of mechanical signals between the support, the cytoskeleton and the nucleus.

The equilibrium, in the cytoskeleton of each cell, is between contractile microfilaments and microtubules resistant to compression; it is also done in the membership of the ECM by a game of pressure and tension that cancel out in a situation of equilibrium. Energy is generated by actin.

Micropatterning has shown these phenomena on the scale of a cell fixed on a support.

Increased stiffness of the ECM: the spreading of the cell - on the support, representation of the ECM - is necessary for the cell division (thus the growth).

Decrease of the rigidity of the ECM: when the ECM is deformed, the cell traction causes the stop of the growth and a differentiation of the cell or an apoptosis.

The soft material that transmits the mechanical signals is therefore pre-stressed and this allows the transmission of forces in the body with a quantitative distribution according to the scale: the skeleton, a macroscopic structure, will transmit much greater forces than an isolated organ.

On the scale of a tissue of an organ, the entire mechanical signal transmission network, including integrins, cadherins, focal adhesions (all intercellular junctions and ETM/cells), membrane, cytoskeleton, etc. also support the production of energy. Indeed, mitochondria are an integral part of this network and semi-solid (non-liquid) phase biochemistry is an important part of tissue metabolism.

Here a principle of treatment by the mechanical signals can be found.

=== The circulating cell ===
The Young's modulus of Circulating Tumor Cells (CTCs) is very strongly correlated with the severity of cancer in all its parameters - differentiation, metastatic potential, prognostic and predictive correlation. These correlations are valid for metaplastic, dysplastic, in situ and cancerous cells.

=== The journey of the metastatic cell ===
CTCs must cross the ECM, enter the bloodstream or lymphatic vessels, and then leave the circulation to attach to a tissue for metastasis.

== Components of the constraint ==
The tumor accumulates mechanical energy during its growth. In an article by Stylianopoulos, the author uses a simple technique to highlight tumor constraints: an ex vivo tumor laser cutting frees the accumulated constraints. They are expressed as bulges that can be measured and related to the underlying stress. In the center of the tumor the radial and circumferential stresses are compressive; in the periphery of the tumor the radial stress is compressive, and the circumferential stress is a linear traction along the outer limit of the tumor.

Tumor growth causes stress on the healthy tissues around it.

The ExtraCellular Matrix (ECM) and the cells in contact with the ECM exert mutual tensions.

The cells of the tumor tissue exert tensions between themselves.

This results in a change in fluid flow in the tumor with an increase in intratumoral interstitial pressure.

The internal tension present in the excised tumor can be called "residual stress": when cut, an expansion of the volume can clearly be seen, which shows this residual tension.

Another track was opened by J Fredberg, in two dimensions:

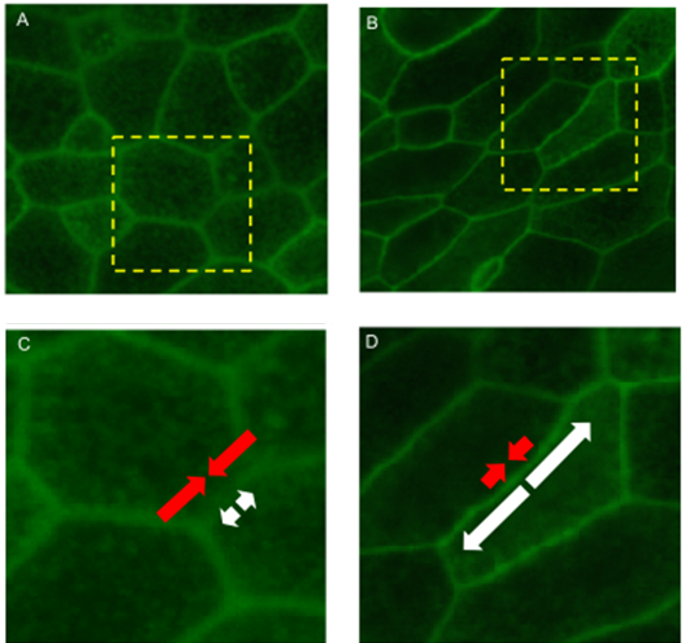

As the intercellular adhesion stress increases, there is a histological architecture change and a solid to liquid phase transition.

The mechanical energy, cellular cohesion of the tumor tissue, is attributable, in large part, intercellular junctions and can be expressed in linear traction that has two components:

- Contraction energy in red, positive, which comes from the cytoskeleton and which minimizes the intercellular surface (Euclidean, pseudo solid when it dominates);
- Energy of adhesion, in white, negative and which maximizes the surface (fractal, pseudo liquid when it dominates).

== Soft matter ==
Soft matter physics studies materials between solid and liquid; at biological ambient temperatures, thermal energy is of the same order of magnitude as the interaction energies between the various components. Due to this entropy/enthalpy balance, these biological systems can be organized in a radically different way under the influence of small external variations.

== Stress tensors ==
The stress tensor is the generalization of the concept of constraint field. It summarizes in a mathematical expression all the pressures involved in a volume. Here, it is the volume of the tumor with a solid sphere, the tumor tissue, predominantly viscoelastic and a hollow sphere, the ECM, predominantly elastic. The solid sphere is embedded in the hollow sphere.

== Organization of the cytoskeleton and continuity of structures transmitting mechanical signals ==
The mechanical signals travel through the organs, without any break in continuity. At the tissue level, it is the connective tissue or the ECM that ensures this continuity. At the cellular level, it is the continuity between the connective tissue, the cell membrane, the cytoskeleton and the nucleus that ensures this transmission.

== At what scale? The laws of biology and physics ==
A hitherto dominant approach is the bottom-up approach: the understanding of the biological mechanisms (mechanoreceptors, actin and other components of cytoskeleton, intracellular signaling, gene effectors, etc.) must lead to an understanding of the phenomena at scale, above be here mesoscopic, tissue.

There are success stories of this approach when one can identify a faulty gene with a mutation and it is possible to act by a drug on the outcome of the mutation: a receptor or an enzyme.

This "one-to-one and first-degree equation" allowed Chronic Myeloid Leukemia to be controlled by imatinib. The defective BCR-ABL gene makes it possible to manufacture an abnormal version of an enzyme of the Tyrosine Kinase type present in leukemic cells. Imatinib inhibits this enzyme and the manufacture of these cells.

These few exceptions imply that this reasoning could be applied to cancers as a whole.

But the "equation" of cancer is much more complex. And the massive failure of "targeted therapies" to cure cancer is the illustration. These targeted therapies have cured only 50% of HER2 positive breast cancers treated with adjuvant therapy after local cancer treatment. That is 3% of breast cancers. That's all. Moreover, their participation in the "chronicization" of the breast and prostate - even some colon or rectum - is very minor compared to chemo / hormonotherapy, much better used today.

The top-down approach takes into account the emergence of unpredictable phenomena through the reductionist approach. Thus, the experimental evidence showing that carcinogenesis is a process bound to emerge a break geometry of the tissue architecture requires abandoning the genetic level or above genetics to get into systems biology and put the matter to cell/tissue level.

In fact, cell phenotypes are emergent phenomena that result from intercellular nonlinear interactions and interaction with the environment that is to say the ECM. This is usually described in a phase space, where attractors dot the landscape and are points of stability or instability.

== Fractality ==
The cancer is fractal and this in all its components and at different scales micro/meso and macroscopic.

This geometry is recent and still little integrated in our mental representations.

The first observation was the fractal nature of microcalcifications linked to breast cancer on a mammogram.

Then the fractality of the cancer has been demonstrated on different structures of the organ cancer - neoangiogenesis, tumor growth zone, tumor tissue, etc. - and at the microscopic scale (the cell nucleus and cell surface).

== Synergy ==
A synergy between immunotherapy and the use of mechanical signals is highly likely as shown by two recent papers that describe the control of PDL-1 expression and immunocompetent cells by extracellular matrix stiffness.

== Thermodynamics ==
Fractality is a means that evolution has found to minimize the energy used to distribute resources. Cancer uses a source of energy different from other tissues that is less efficient in yield.

== Studies related to the reversibility of cancerous tissue ==
The intuitions of D'Arcy Thompson are now accepted by all: the shape that organs (including cancer) and organisms take depends on the variations in time and space of the mechanical properties of the tissues.

J Wolff described the histological variations of the bone according to the load which weighs on it. This is similar to the concept of removing a vein to bypass a coronary artery and grafting it into the artery position to change its histology; due to a new pressure regime, it becomes an artery. The same conclusion can be drawn from studies on the transformation of bone and cartilage tissue under different pressure regimes.

In the 1950s, the genetic paradigm emerged. This paradigm posits that cancers arise from 1 or more mutated cells, and progression results from the sequential accumulation of tumor-free random mutations of all homeostatic controls.

The discovery of oncogenes, suppressor genes, stability genes (caretaker) is a coherent and reliable set to track the birth and progression of cancer.

But the contradictory experimental facts are not lacking: the carcinogens are not all mutagens (hormones...); the target of carcinogens may be the ECM and not the cell; an ECM exposed to a carcinogen brought into contact with a non-cancerous tissue will cause cancer of this tissue, but not vice versa; a cancerous tissue in close contact with a normal ECM may become normal tissue again.

Other authors have shown that it is possible to return to a normal architecture a cancerous tissue when it was taken in charge by an embryonic environment then by somatic tissue.

== Re-emergence of the study of mechanical signals in the biology of living organisms ==
Several teams, particularly in the US, had maintained an expertise in the study of non-biological signals in oncology. However, the dominance of genetics and molecular biology since the middle of the 20th century marginalized this approach until its revival at the beginning of the 21st century. This re-emergence benefitted from developments in genetics and molecular biology in the mechanobiological approach.

== Overlap with other fields ==
Biophysical principles studied in physical oncology have also been applied to studies in embryology and tissue engineering.

== See also ==
- Mechanobiology
