= Mechanics of human sexuality =

Biomechanics of human sexual intercourse

The mechanics of human sexuality or mechanics of sex, or more formally the biomechanics of human sexuality, is the study of the mechanics related to human sexual activity. Examples of topics include the biomechanical study of the strength of vaginal tissues and the biomechanics of male erectile function. The mechanics of sex under limit circumstances, such as sexual activity at zero-gravity in outer space, are also being studied.

Pioneering researchers studied the male and female genitals during coitus (penile-vaginal penetration) with ultrasound technology in 1992 and magnetic resonance imaging (MRI) in 1999, mapping the anatomy of the activity and taking images illustrating the fit of male and female genitals. In the research using MRI, researchers imaged couples performing coitus inside an MRI machine. The magnetic resonance images also showed that the penis has the shape of a boomerang, that one third of its length consists of the root of the penis, and that the vaginal walls wrap snugly around it. Moreover, MRI during coitus indicate that the internal part of the clitoris is stimulated by penile-vaginal movements. These studies highlight the role of the clitoris and indicate that what is termed the G-spot may only exist because the highly innervated clitoris is pulled closely to the anterior wall of the vagina when the woman is sexually aroused and during vaginal penetration.
