= Vijay K. Goel =

American engineer

Vijay K. Goel (March 5, 1945 - August 25, 2024) was an American engineer, pioneer in the field of computational biomechanics for orthopedic surgery, and previously the Distinguished University Professor and McMaster-Gardner Endowed Chair at the University of Toledo. Goel was the 2014 recipient of the American Society of Biomechanics Borelli award, which recognizes outstanding career accomplishment in biomechanics.
