= Mary Cunningham Boyce =

American mechanical engineering professor and academic administrator

Provost of Columbia University
- In office July 1, 2021 – June 30, 2023
- Preceded by: Ira Katznelson (interim)
- Succeeded by: Dennis Mitchell (interim)

Personal details
- Children: Chris Boyce
- Education: Virginia Tech (BS); Massachusetts Institute of Technology (SM, PhD)

Mary Cunningham Boyce is a professor of engineering at Columbia University. She was provost of Columbia University from July 2021 to June 2023. Previously, she was dean of the Fu Foundation School of Engineering and Applied Science from 2013 to 2021.

Her research focuses on materials and mechanics, particularly in the areas of multi-scale mechanics of polymers and soft composites, both those that are man-made and those formed naturally.

== Background ==
Boyce received a bachelor of science in engineering science and mechanics from Virginia Polytechnic Institute and State University in 1981. She also received a master of science and a doctor of philosophy in mechanical engineering from the Massachusetts Institute of Technology in 1984 and 1987. Prior to joining Columbia University, Boyce spent twenty-five years as a faculty member at MIT. During her last years at MIT, she was the Head of Department for Mechanical Engineering and the Ford Professor of Engineering.

Boyce's research interests include the multi-scale mechanics of polymers, soft composites and soft tissues. Her research has been in theory, computation and experimental elements of the nonlinear, finite deformation, elastic and inelastic, time-dependent behavior of polymeric-based materials. Her leadership in the field of the mechanics of materials has expanded the understanding of interplay between micro-geometry and the inherent physical behavior of a material, which has led to innovative hybrid material designs, as well as materials structures that transform or morph into a different structure. Models and results from Professor Boyce's group have the potential to influence a range of industrial and academic fields from polymer processing to composite material design, tire mechanics, biological cells and tissues. The author of more than 170 publications with her group, she is also the holder of five US patents. Boyce has mentored over 25 PhD students including Ellen Arruda and numerous postdoctoral researchers. Her PhD students and postdoctoral researchers have gone onto faculty positions across the country and the world, as well as to national laboratories, industries and consulting careers.

Boyce has been widely recognized for her scholarly achievements, including election as a fellow of the American Society of Mechanical Engineers, the American Academy of Mechanics, and the American Academy of Arts and Sciences. She was also elected a member of the National Academy of Engineering in 2012 for contributions to understanding the mechanics of deformation in engineered and natural polymeric solids. In 2020, Dr. Boyce became the first woman to receive the Timoshenko Medal of the American Society of Mechanical Engineers.

She has been honored for her teaching at MIT, where she was named a MacVicar Faculty Fellow and received the Joseph Henry Keenan Innovation in Undergraduate Education Award.
