= Cardiovascular System Dynamics Society =

The Cardiovascular System Dynamics Society (CSDS), founded on 5 October 1976 in Philadelphia, Pennsylvania, by organ system physiologist and biomedical engineers, was a historic first in its mathematical and quantitative approach to cardiovascular mechanics.

== Organisation ==
Currently the society includes investigators in muscle and vascular biology, subcellular and sarcomere dynamics, the microcirculation, cardiovascular biology, clinical disease, and modeling. The primary theme remains cardiovascular function, its physiologic and molecular mechanisms, with an aim to understand how these features integrate to achieve overall performance. An important component of the overall approach remains inclusion of mathematical predictive and causal models for the micro to the macro level.

== Conferences ==
Biannual conferences rotate between Europe, North America and Japan.
