= Kai-Nan An =

Medical researcher and academic

Kai-Nan An (Chinese: 安介南) is a biomedical engineering researcher and academic.

== Personal life ==
An graduated from National Cheng Kung University (NCKU) in 1969 with a bachelor's degree in mechanical engineering, and then moved to the United States to pursue a PhD at Lehigh University. Under the guidance of his doctoral advisor Eric P. Salathe, he completed a master's dissertation on interaction of gravity wave with shear flows in 1972 and a doctoral dissertation on fluid movement across capillary walls in 1975.

An met his wife Wang Sui-ching (王穗清) while living in Taipei during his mandatory military service following his university graduation. Wang, then a student in National Taiwan University's foreign literature department, was the niece of An's neighbor. An was married to Wang until her death in 2010. He later endowed a scholarship in his wife's memory to support graduates of NCKU to pursue further studies abroad.

== Career ==
An was a research associate at the Mayo Clinic between 1975 and 1978, then was promoted to an assistant professorship in 1978 at the Mayo Clinic College of Medicine and Science, followed by an associate professorship from 1984, and a full professorship in 1988. He held the John and Posy Krehbiel Professorship from 1993 to his retirement in 2014, when he was granted emeritus status.

In 2022 he was elected to the Academia Sinica.
