= List of biofluid mechanics research groups =

This list of biofluid mechanics research groups gives an overview of academic research organisations in the field.

| Country | University / Institute | Group | Topic |
|---|---|---|---|
| Australia | UNSW Australia | Sydney Vascular Modelling Group Advanced and Thermofluidics Group | Cardiovascular fluid dynamics and mechanics, stent design and strategy optimization, arterial flow and stenosis, transport of drugs from stents |
| Australia | ANU | Optical Biofluidics Imaging (oBIG) Lab | Biomedical Photonics, Biofluidics Imaging, Applied Optics |
| Belgium | Ghent University | BioMMeda | Biomedical ultrasound research, medical devices, cardiovascular mechanics, (artificial) organs and biofluids |
| Canada | University of Toronto | Biomedical Simulation Lab | Hemodynamic factors in atherogenesis, stroke risk assessment, optimization of bypass graft surgery |
| Canada | University of Western Ontario | Biofluidics Research Lab | Vascular models (atherosclerosis, aneurysms), microfluidics and lab-on-a-chip, cell mechanotransduction |
| Germany | Charité – Universitätsmedizin Berlin | Biofluid Mechanics Lab | Blood pressure measurement, ventricular assist devices, flow visualization methods (PIV, dye erosion/washout), Computational Fluid Dynamics, heart valves, blood damage, thrombus formation, congenital heart disease, patient-specific modelling |
| Germany | RWTH Aachen | Laboratory for Biomedical Fluid Mechanics | Flows in artificial organs, artificial heart valve prostheses, blood pumps |
| Germany | University of Bayreuth | Biofluid Simulation and Modeling | Drug delivery agents in blood flow, interfacial water, molecular dynamics of liquid organic solar cells |
| India | Indian Institute of Space Science and Technology | Heat Transfer Lab | Cerebrovascular Biofluid Mechanics and Brain Artery Study in Microgravity |
| Israel | Israel Institute of Technology | The Technion Biofluids Laboratory | Respiratory flows, small-scale physiological flows using microfluidic techniques |
| Israel | Ariel University | The Ariel Biomechanics Center (ABmC) | Heart valves, medical devices |
| Italy | Politecnico di Milano | LaBS | Intracranial aneurysm, pediatric surgical corrections, fetal hemodynamics |
| Netherlands | University of Twente | Computational Physiology | Intracranial aneurysm, Cerebrospinal Fluid Flow, Regimes of flow in Physiology, Numerical Methods, High Performance Computing |
| Norway | Simula Research Laboratory | Simula | Intracranial aneurysm, Cerebrospinal Fluid Flow, Cardiac Biomechanics, Numerical Methods |
| Singapore | NUS | Biofluid Mechanics Research Laboratory | Biofluid Mechanics, Computational Fluid Dynamics, Cardiovascular Engineering, Particle Image Velocimetry |
| Switzerland | École polytechnique fédérale de Lausanne | LHTC | Wave propagation, Cerebrospinal Fluid Mechanics, Hemodynamical forces and vascular diseases |
| Switzerland | University of Bern | ARTORG Cardiovascular Engineering Group | Heart valves, complex vascular networks, advanced pumping systems |
| Switzerland | University of Zurich | The Interface Group | Cerebrospinal fluid dynamics, cardiovascular fluid mechanics, integrated flow chambers for mechanobiology, biomedical applications |
| Turkey | Koç University | Pekkan Biofluid Mechanics Laboratory | Cardiovascular fluid mechanics, ontogenical hemodynamics |
| United Kingdom | University College London | MUSE | Cardiovascular fluid mechanics, cardiovascular engineering |
| United Kingdom | Imperial College London | The Xu Group | Cardiovascular diseases, Fluid–structure interaction, drug delivery |
| United Kingdom | University of Sheffield | CISTIB | Biomedical imaging, interventional planning, medical devices |
| United Kingdom | Imperial College London | Cardiovascular Biomechanics and Ultrasound Laboratory | Embryonic and fetal cardiac flows, congenital heart malformations, placenta and umbilical biomechanics, anti-thrombotic blood pumps |
| United Kingdom | University of Strathclyde | Biofluid Mechanics (BioFLM) research group | Biofluid mechanics, haemodynamics, cardiovascular fluid mechanics, in-silico modelling of fluids in biological systems |
| United States | Colorado State University | Cardiovascular and Biofluid Mechanics Laboratory | Heart valve, heart development, Fluid–structure interaction |
| United States | Georgia Institute of Technology | Cardiovascular Fluid Mechanics Laboratory | Biomechanics of vascular pathologies, medical devices |
| United States | Georgia Institute of Technology | Biofluids and Medical Device Research Group | Cardiac and valvular mechanics, aortic valve mechanobiology, prosthetic heart valve mechanics, pediatric cardiovascular engineering |
| United States | University of Idaho | NIML - Neurophysiological Imaging and Modeling Laboratory | Cerebrospinal fluid dynamics, Intrathecal drug and gene vector delivery, hydrocephalus and Chiari malformation, medical devices, neurodegenerative disorders |
| United States | University of Illinois at Chicago | Laboratory for Product and Process Design | Cerebrospinal fluid flow, intrathecal drug delivery, intrathecal magnetic drug targeting, convection-enhanced drug delivery, whole brain cerebral blood flow, oxygen perfusion in cerebral microvasculature, cerebral water transport by Aquaporin 4, hydrocephalus smart shunt design |
| United States | University of Maryland | Biofluid Dynamics Laboratory | Hemodynamics and hemopathology in the microcirculation, drop dynamics |
| United States | University of Massachusetts Amherst | Biofluids and Vascular Biology Laboratory : Jiménez Lab | Cardiovascular stents, Lymphatic flow study |
| United States | Massachusetts Institute of Technology | Edelman Lab | Drug delivery, medical devices |
| United States | University of Michigan | Biofluid Mechanics Research Laboratory | Lung airway closure/re-opening, pulmonary surfactant delivery, artificial lung, ocular flows |
| United States | University of Minnesota | St. Anthony Falls Laboratory | Cardiovascular fluid mechanics, medical devices, virtual surgery |
| United States | Stony Brook University | Biofluids Research Group | Heart valves, artificial heart, left ventricular assist device |
| United States | The City College of New York | The Wallace H. Coulter Laboratory for Cardiovascular Dynamics and Biomolecular Transport | Vascular diseases, mechanotransduction, glycocalyx |
| United States | Tulane University | Biofluid Mechanics Laboratory | Improved therapies for pulmonary disease ARDS, prevention of ventilator-induced lung injury |
| United States | University of Texas at San Antonio | Vascular Biomechanics and Biofluids Laboratory | Medical devices, Abdominal aortic aneurysm, Fluid–structure interaction |
| United States | The George Washington University | Biofluid Dynamics Laboratory | Arterial flows, intraglottal flows |
| United States | Wright State University | Multi-Scale Cardiovascular Bioengineering Laboratory | Heart valve disease, Congenital heart defects, Mechanobiology, Fluid–structure interaction, Particle-image velocimetry |
| United States | Northern Arizona University | Cardiovascular Biomechanics Lab | Mass transport in Cardiovascular system, Heart valve calcification study, Particle deposition in Respiratory tract |
