= Forensic biomechanics =

Forensic biomechanics is the application of biomechanical engineering science to litigation where biomechanical experts determine whether an accident was the cause of an alleged injury. Application of biomechanics to the analysis of an accident involves an accident reconstruction coupled with an analysis of the motions and forces affecting the people involved in the accident. A biomechanical expert’s testimony on the motions and forces involved in an accident may be both relevant and probative on the issue of injury causation.

== History ==
During the years 2005 to 2019, the Courts of New York City witnessed the innovation and widespread use of biomechanical experts. Soon after the innovation of biomechanical experts in the Courts of New York City, prominent trial attorneys and the New York State Bar Association began offering scholarly articles and educational seminars on the use of biomechanical experts. Notable articles on Biomechanical Experts include: "New York State Bar Association Bar Journal November/December 2010 - The Rise of Biomechanical Experts at Trial by Robert Glick, Esq. and Sean O'Loughlin, Esq.", "The Role of Biomechanics Engineering: an Explanation in Accident Reconstruction by Richard Sands, Esq.", "New York Law Journal - Using Biomechanical Science in Labor Law and Premises Cases by Richard Sands, Esq.", "New York Law Journal - Winning the Biomechanical 'Frye' Hearing by Steven Balson-Cohen, Esq," PropertyCasualty360 - Insurers Tap Biomechanics To Fix Blame For Injuries Claimed In Crashes."

On December 28, 2018, the New York Law Journal published an article by prominent trial attorney Steven Balson-Cohen titled "Requiem for the Biomechanical ‘Frye’ Hearing?" revealing that the current state of the law in New York was that all four appellate divisions had accepted the legitimacy of biomechanical science in the courtroom.

Prominent trial attorneys in biomechanics include but are not limited to: Stephen B. Toner, Francis J. Scahill, Richard M. Sands, Claire F. Rush, Steven Balson-Cohen, John J. Komar, Howard Greenwald, Maurice J. Recchia, Cecil E. Floyd, Philip J. Rizzuto, Milene Mansouri, Joseph Jednak, Paul Koors, Anthony E. Graziani, Kristen N. Reed, and John Corring.
