= OpenSim (simulation toolkit) =

Opensource biomechanical simulator software

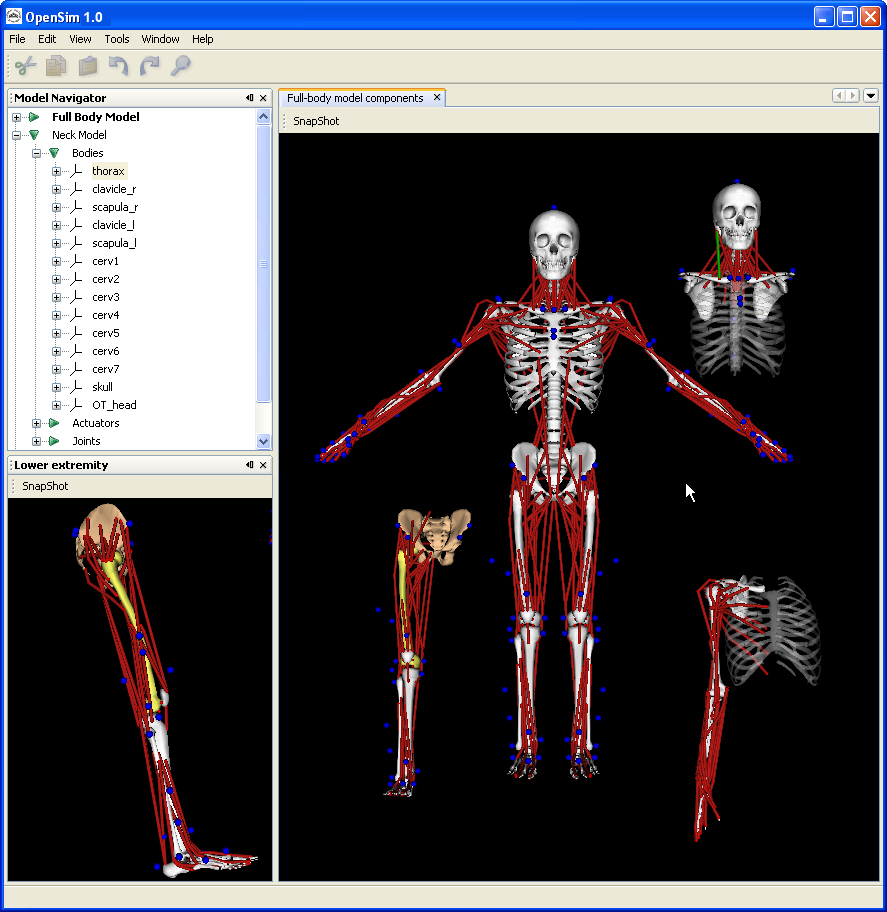
- Sample Musculoskeletal Models in OpenSim
- Developer: Simbios
- Stable release: 4.5 / March 9, 2024; 22 months ago
- Repository: github.com/opensim-org/opensim-core
- Operating system: Cross-platform
- Type: Technical computing
- License: Apache 2.0
- Website: simtk.org/projects/opensim/

OpenSim is an open source software system for biomechanical modeling, simulation and analysis. Its purpose is to provide free and widely accessible tools for conducting biomechanics research and motor control science. OpenSim enables a wide range of studies, including analysis of walking dynamics, studies of sports performance, simulations of surgical procedures, analysis of joint loads, design of medical devices, and animation of human and animal movement. The software performs inverse dynamics analysis and forward dynamics simulations. OpenSim is used in hundreds of biomechanics laboratories around the world to study movement and has a community of software developers contributing new features.

OpenSim is one of the flagship applications from Simbios, a NIH Center for Biomedical Computation at Stanford University. Founded in 2004, Simbios is charged with a mandate to provide leading software and computational tools for physics-based modeling and simulation of biological structures. OpenSim was designed to propel biomechanics research by providing a common framework for investigation and a vehicle for exchanging complex musculoskeletal models.

== History ==
- OpenSim 1.0 was released on August 20, 2007 and provided capabilities for viewing musculoskeletal models, importing models developed in SIMM (Musculographics Inc.), editing muscle paths, and generating muscle actuated simulations that track experimental data.
- OpenSim 1.1 was released on December 11, 2007, which added new features such as user-specified camera positions for recording movies of simulations, and a perturbation (sensitivity) analysis for inquiry into the function of individual muscles.
- OpenSim 2.2.1 was released on April 11, 2011. This software update enhanced the user interface and allowed the user to set bounds on activations of muscles and actuators relating to static optimization not dynamic optimization.
- OpenSim 2.4 was released on October 10, 2011. This newest and most recent update includes faster and more robust tools for Inverse Dynamics and Inverse Kinematics, new visualization tools, enhanced access for API users, and many usability improvements.
- OpenSim 3.2 was released on March 13, 2014. This update focused on improving the OpenSim scripting interface, accessible through the graphical user interface (GUI), Matlab, and now Python. It also added new visualization capabilities and usability improvements in the OpenSim application. Full list of features can be found here.
