= American Society of Biomechanics =

American learned society

The American Society of Biomechanics (ASB) is a scholarly society that focuses on biomechanics across a variety of academic fields. It was founded in 1977 by a group of scientists and clinicians. The ASB holds an annual conference as an arena to disseminate and learn about the most recent progress in the field, to distribute awards to recognize excellent work, and to engage in public outreach to expand the impact of its members.

== Conferences ==
The society hosts an annual conference that takes place in North America (usually USA). These conferences are periodically joint conferences held in conjunction with the International Society of Biomechanics, the North American Congress on Biomechanics, and the World Congress of Biomechanics. The annual conference, when not partnered with another conference, receives around 700 to 800 abstract submissions per year, with attendees in approximately the same numbers. The first conference was held in 1977.

Often, work presented at these conferences achieves media attention due to the ‘public interest’ nature of the findings or that new devices are introduced there. Examples include:

- the effect of tablet reading on cervical spine posture;
- the squeak of the basketball shoe;
- ‘underwear’ to address back-pain;
- recovery after exercise;
- exoskeleton boots for joint pain during exercise;
- how flamingos stand on one leg.

== National Biomechanics Day ==
The ASB is instrumental in promoting National Biomechanics Day, which has received international recognition. In New Zealand, Massey University attracted NZ$48,000 of national funding through the Unlocking Curious Minds programme to promote National Biomechanics Day, with the aim to engage 1,100 students from lower-decile schools in an experiential learning day focused on the science of biomechanics.

It was first held in 2016 on April 7, and consisted of ‘open house’ visits from middle and high school students to biomechanics research and teaching laboratories across the US.

In 2017, National Biomechanics Day was held on April 6. An estimated 7000+ number of high school students participated in events around USA and internationally with significant media attention International participation was recognised from Australia, Belgium, Brazil, Canada, England, Ireland, New Zealand, South Africa, and Taiwan.

== Awards ==
The society grants a number of annual awards both honouring individuals in the field, and honouring notable research projects. The most notable of these is the Borelli Award, which has been awarded annually since 1984 for outstanding career accomplishment in any field of biomechanics. Past winners include:

Year	Winner
2023	Ellen M.Arruda
2022	Thomas S Buchanan
2021	Glenn Fleisig
2020	Steve P. Messier
2019	Irene S. Davis
2018	Roger Enoka
2017	Mark Grabiner
2016	Ted Gross
2015	Rodger Kram
2014	Vijay K. Goel
2013	Kenton Kaufman
2012	Carlo DeLuca
2011	Scott Delp
2010	Farshid Guilak
2009	James Ashton-Miller
2008	David Burr
2007	Rick Lieber
2006	Walter Herzog
2005	Kai-Nan An
2004	Tom Andriacchi
2003	R. McNeil Alexander
2002	Mimi Koehl
2001	Felix Zajac
2000	Clinton Rubin

The ASB Grants for Diversity, Equity, and Inclusion (GRADE) grant program was created by the American Society of Biomechanics Diversity Committee to enhance recruitment and retention efforts of underrepresented populations in biomechanics. The grant supports diversity, equity, and inclusion (DEI) educational, research, and capacity-building initiatives provided by biomechanics organizations and awards amounts up to $5000.

Year	Winners
2022	International Women in Biomechanics Black Biomechanists Association Latinx in Biomechanix
