= Mechanobiology =

Field of science

Mechanobiology is an emerging field of science at the interface of biology, engineering, chemistry and physics. It focuses on how physical forces and changes in the mechanical properties of cells and tissues contribute to development, cell differentiation, physiology, and disease. Mechanical forces are experienced and may be interpreted to give biological responses in cells. The movement of joints, compressive loads on the cartilage and bone during exercise, and shear pressure on the blood vessel during blood circulation are all examples of mechanical forces in human tissues. A major challenge in the field is understanding mechanotransduction—the molecular mechanisms by which cells sense and respond to mechanical signals. While medicine has typically looked for the genetic and biochemical basis of disease, advances in mechanobiology suggest that changes in cell mechanics, extracellular matrix structure, or mechanotransduction may contribute to the development of many diseases, including atherosclerosis, fibrosis, asthma, osteoporosis, heart failure, and cancer. Recent work has highlighted a critical role for mechanical regulation of the blood–brain barrier (BBB) in development, ageing, and neurological disease. There is also a strong mechanical basis for many generalized medical disabilities, such as lower back pain, foot and postural injury, deformity, and irritable bowel syndrome.

== Load sensitive cells ==
=== Fibroblasts ===
Skin fibroblasts are vital in development and wound repair and they are affected by mechanical cues like tension, compression and shear pressure. Fibroblasts synthesize structural proteins, some of which are mechanosensitive and form integral part of the extracellular Matrix (ECM) e.g. collagen types I, III, IV, V VI, elastin, lamin etc. In addition to the structural proteins, fibroblasts make Tumor-Necrosis-Factor- alpha (TNF-α), Transforming-Growth-Factor-beta (TGF-β) and matrix metalloproteases that plays in tissue in tissue maintenance and remodeling.

=== Chondrocytes ===
Articular cartilage is the connective tissue that protects bones of load-bearing joints like knee, shoulder by providing a lubricated surface. It deforms in response to compressive load, thereby reducing stress on bones. This mechanical responsiveness of articular cartilage is due to its biphasic nature; it contains both the solid and fluid phases. The fluid phase is made up of water -which contributes 80% of the wet weight – and inorganic ions e.g. Sodium ion, Calcium ion and Potassium ion. The solid phase is made up of porous ECM. The proteoglycans and interstitial fluids interact to give compressive force to the cartilage through negative electrostatic repulsive forces. The ion concentration difference between the extracellular and intracellular ions composition of chondrocytes result in hydrostatic pressure. During development, mechanical environment of joint determines surface and topology of the joint. In adult, moderate mechanical loading is required to maintain cartilage; immobilization of joint leads to loss of proteoglycans and cartilage atrophy while excess mechanical loading results in degeneration of joint.

== Nuclear mechanobiology ==
The nucleus is also responsive to mechanical signals which are relayed from the extracellular matrix through the cytoskeleton by the help of Linker of Nucleoskeleton and Cytoskeleton LINC-associated proteins like KASH and SUN. Examples of effect of mechanical responses in the nucleus involve:

- Hyperosmotic challenge results in chromosome condensation and translocation and activation of the Ataxia Telangiectasia and Rad3-related (ATR) to the nuclear peripheral region while mechanical stretching due to hypo-osmotic challenge and compression re-localizes and activates cPLA2 to the nuclear membrane.
- High nuclear tension on the Lamin A hinders the access of kinases, thereby suppressing its degradation etc.

== Mechanobiology of embryogenesis ==
The embryo is formed by self-assembly through which cells differentiate into tissues performing specialized functions. It was previously believed that only chemical signals give cues that control spatially oriented changes in cell growth, differentiation and fate switching that mediate morphogenetic controls. This is based on the ability of chemical signals to induce biochemical responses like tissue patterning in distant cells. However, it is now known that mechanical forces generated within cells and tissues provide regulatory signals.

During the division of the fertilized oocyte, cells aggregate and the compactness between cells increases with the help of actomyosin-dependent cytoskeletal traction forces and their application to adhesive receptors in neighboring cells, thereby leading to formation of solid balls called Morula. The spindle positioning within symmetrically and asymmetrically dividing cells in the early embryo is controlled by mechanical forces mediated by microtubules and actin microfilament system. Local variation in physical forces and mechanical cues such as stiffness of the ECM also control the expression of genes that give rise to the embryonic developmental process of blastulation. The loss of stiffness-controlled transcription factor Cdx leads to the ectopic expression of inner cell mass markers in the trophectoderm, and the pluripotent transcription factor, Oct-4 may be negatively expressed, thereby inducing lineage switching. This cell fate switching is regulated by the mechanosensitive hippo pathway

== Applications ==
The effectiveness of many of the mechanical therapies already in clinical use shows how important physical forces can be in physiological control. Several examples illustrate this point. Pulmonary surfactant promotes lung development in premature infants; modifying the tidal volumes of mechanical ventilators reduces morbidity and death in patients with acute lung injury. Expandable stents physically prevent coronary artery constriction. Tissue expanders increase the skin area available for reconstructive surgery. Surgical tension application devices are used for bone fracture healing, orthodontics, cosmetic breast expansion and closure of non-healing wounds.

Insights into the mechanical basis of tissue regulation may also lead to development of improved medical devices, biomaterials, and engineered tissues for tissue repair and reconstruction.

Known contributors to cellular mechanotransduction are a growing list and include stretch-activated ion channels—the failure of which has been recently categorized within systems engineering ontologies as "hardware sensor errors" derived from membrane friction— caveolae, integrins, cadherins, growth factor receptors, myosin motors, cytoskeletal filaments, nuclei, extracellular matrix, and numerous other signaling molecules.[17] [18] Endogenous cell-generated traction forces also contribute significantly to these responses by modulating tensional prestress within cells, tissues, and organs that govern their mechanical stability, as well as mechanical signal transmission from the macroscale to the nanoscale.

== See also ==
- Biophysics
