= Hypoelastic material =

In continuum mechanics, a hypoelastic material is an elastic material that has a constitutive model independent of finite strain measures except in the linearized case. Hypoelastic material models are distinct from hyperelastic material models (or standard elasticity models) in that, except under special circumstances, they cannot be derived from a strain energy density function.

== Overview ==
A hypoelastic material can be rigorously defined as one that is modeled using a constitutive equation satisfying the following two criteria:

1. The Cauchy stress $\boldsymbol{\sigma}$ at time $t$ depends only on the order in which the body has occupied its past configurations, but not on the time rate at which these past configurations were traversed. As a special case, this criterion includes a Cauchy elastic material, for which the current stress depends only on the current configuration rather than the history of past configurations.
2. There is a tensor-valued function $G$ such that
  $$\dot{\boldsymbol{\sigma}} = G(\boldsymbol{\sigma},\boldsymbol{L}) \,,$$
  in which $\dot{\boldsymbol{\sigma}}$ is the material rate of the Cauchy stress tensor, and $\boldsymbol{L}$ is the spatial velocity gradient tensor.

If only these two original criteria are used to define hypoelasticity, then hyperelasticity would be included as a special case, which prompts some constitutive modelers to append a third criterion that specifically requires a hypoelastic model to not be hyperelastic (i.e., hypoelasticity implies that stress is not derivable from an energy potential). If this third criterion is adopted, it follows that a hypoelastic material might admit nonconservative adiabatic loading paths that start and end with the same deformation gradient but do not start and end at the same internal energy.

Note that the second criterion requires only that the function $G$ exists. As explained below, specific formulations of hypoelastic models typically employ a so-called objective stress rate so that the $G$ function exists only implicitly.

Hypoelastic material models frequently take the form
$$\overset{\circ}{\boldsymbol{\tau}} = \mathsf{M}:\boldsymbol{d}$$
where $\overset{\circ}{\boldsymbol{\tau}}$ is an objective rate of the Kirchhoff stress ($\boldsymbol{\tau} := J\boldsymbol{\sigma}$), $\boldsymbol{d}:=\left[\frac{1}{2}(\boldsymbol{L}+\boldsymbol{L}^T)\right]$ is the deformation rate tensor, and $\mathsf{M}$ is the so-called elastic tangent stiffness tensor, which varies with stress itself and is regarded as a material property tensor. In hyperelasticity, the tangent stiffness generally must also depend on the deformation gradient in order to properly account for distortion and rotation of anisotropic material fiber directions.

== Hypoelasticity and objective stress rates ==
In many practical problems of solid mechanics, it is sufficient to characterize material deformation by the small (or linearized) strain tensor
$$\varepsilon_{ij} = \frac 1 2 (u_{i,j} + u_{j,i})$$
where $u_i$ are the components of the displacements of continuum points, the subscripts refer to Cartesian coordinates $x_i$ $(i=1,2,3)$, and the subscripts preceded by a comma denote partial derivatives (e.g., $u_{i,j} = \partial u_i /\partial x_j$). But there are also many problems where the finiteness of strain must be taken into account. These are of two kinds:

1. large nonlinear elastic deformations possessing a potential energy, $W(\boldsymbol{F})$ (exhibited, e.g., by rubber), in which the stress tensor components are obtained as the partial derivatives of $W$ with respect to the finite strain tensor components; and
2. inelastic deformations possessing no potential, in which the stress-strain relation is defined incrementally.

In the former kind, the total strain formulation described in the article on finite strain theory is appropriate. In the latter kind an incremental (or rate) formulation is necessary and must be used in every load or time step of a finite element computer program using updated Lagrangian procedure. The absence of a potential raises intricate questions due to the freedom in the choice of finite strain measure and characterization of the stress rate.

For a sufficiently small loading step (or increment), one may use the deformation rate tensor (or velocity strain)
$$d_{ij} = \dot \varepsilon_{ij} = \frac 1 2 (v_{i,j} + v_{j,i})$$
or increment
$$\Delta \varepsilon_{ij} = \dot \varepsilon_{ij} \Delta t = d_{ij} \Delta t$$
representing the linearized strain increment from the initial (stressed and deformed) state in the step. Here the superior dot represents the material time derivative ($\partial /\partial t$ following a given material particle), $\Delta$ denotes a small increment over the step, $t$ = time, and $v_i = \dot u_i$ = material point velocity or displacement rate.

However, it would not be objective to use the time derivative of the Cauchy (or true) stress $\sigma_{ij}$. This stress, which describes the forces on a small material element imagined to be cut out from the material as currently deformed, is not objective because it varies with rigid body rotations of the material. The material points must be characterized by their initial coordinates $X_i$ (called Lagrangian) because different material particles are contained in the element that is cut out (at the same location) before and after the incremental deformation.

Consequently, it is necessary to introduce the so-called objective stress rate $\hat \sigma_{ij}$, or the corresponding increment $\Delta \sigma_{ij} = \hat \sigma_{ij} \Delta t$. The objectivity is necessary for $\hat \sigma_{ij}$ to be functionally related to the element deformation. It means that that $\hat \sigma_{ij}$ must be invariant with respect to coordinate transformations (particularly rotations) and must characterize the state of the same material element as it deforms.

== See also ==
- Stress measures
- Hyperelastic material
- Objective stress rates
- Principle of material objectivity
- Finite strain theory
- Infinitesimal strain theory

== Bibliography ==
- Truesdell, Clifford (1963), "Remarks on hypo-elasticity", Journal of Research of the National Bureau of Standards Section B, 67B (3): 141–143
