= Josef Finger =

Austrian physicist and mathematician

Josef Finger (1 January 1841 – 6 May 1925) was an Austrian physicist and mathematician. The Finger stress tensor in finite strain theory is named after him.

== Biography ==
Joseph Finger was born the son of a baker in Plzeň. He attended high school in Plzeň. He studied mathematics and physics at Charles University in Prague from 1859 to 1862. In 1865 and for financial reason he acquired the qualification to teach mathematics and physics at secondary schools and went into the teaching profession. On 17 March 1875 Finger received his doctorate at the University of Vienna, in 1876 he was qualified for the subject of analytical mechanics. In 1897 Finger published “On the internal virial of an elastic body". Finger was from 1888 to 1890 the Dean of the Chemical School, and from 1890 to 1891 he was rector of the Technische Hochschule in Vienna. In 1916 Finger was awarded an honorary Doctorate of Technical Sciences. Finger is considered a pioneer of continuum mechanics.
