= Materials with memory =

In continuum physics, materials with memory, also referred as materials with hereditary effects are a class of materials whose constitutive equations contains a dependence upon the past history of thermodynamic, kinetic, electromagnetic or other kind of state variables.

== Historical notes ==
The study of these materials arises from the pioneering articles of Ludwig Boltzmann and Vito Volterra, in which they sought an extension of the concept of an elastic material. The key assumption of their theory was that the local stress value at a time t depends upon the history of the local deformation up to t. In general, in materials with memory the local value of some constitutive quantity (stress, heat flux, electric current, polarization and magnetization, etc.) at a time t depends upon the history of the state variables (deformation, temperature, electric and magnetic fields, etc.). The hypothesis that the remote history of a variable has less influence than its values in the recent past, was stated in modern continuum mechanics as the fading memory principle by Bernard Coleman and Walter Noll. This assumption was implicit in the pioneer works: when restricted to cyclic histories, it traces back to the closed cycle principle stated by Volterra, which leads to a constitutive relation of integral convolution type. In the linear case, this relation takes the form of a Volterra equation.

=== Constitutive relations of materials with memory ===
In the linear case, this relation takes the form of a Volterra equation:

$$\boldsymbol{T}(\boldsymbol{x},t)=\boldsymbol{G}_0(\boldsymbol{x})\boldsymbol{E}(\boldsymbol{x},t)+\int_0^{+\infty}\!\!\!\!\boldsymbol{G}^\prime(\boldsymbol{x},s)\boldsymbol{E}(\boldsymbol{x},t-s)\mathrm{d}s$$

== See also ==
- Biomaterial
- Biomechanics
- Dielectric relaxation
- Hysteresis
- Rheology
- Viscosity
- Viscoelasticity
- Viscoplasticity
