= Pure shear =

Three-dimensional homogeneous flattening of a body

In mechanics and geology, pure shear is a three-dimensional homogeneous flattening of a body. It is an example of irrotational strain in which body is elongated in one direction while being shortened perpendicularly. For soft materials, such as rubber, a strain state of pure shear is often used for characterizing hyperelastic and fracture mechanical behaviour. Pure shear is differentiated from simple shear in that pure shear involves no rigid body rotation.

The deformation gradient for pure shear is given by:

$$F = \begin{bmatrix}1&\gamma&0 \\\gamma&1&0\\0&0&1\end{bmatrix}$$

Note that this gives a Green-Lagrange strain of:

$$E = \frac{1}{2}\begin{bmatrix}\gamma^2&2\gamma&0\\2\gamma&\gamma^2&0\\0&0&0\end{bmatrix}$$

Here there is no rotation occurring, which can be seen from the equal off-diagonal components of the strain tensor. The linear approximation to the Green-Lagrange strain shows that the small strain tensor is:

$$\epsilon = \frac{1}{2}\begin{bmatrix}0&2\gamma&0\\2\gamma&0&0\\0&0&0\end{bmatrix}$$

which has only shearing components.

For the aforementioned deformation gradient, the eigenvalues of the right Cauchy-Green deformation tensor ($\mathbf C = \mathbf F^T \mathbf F = 2 \mathbf E + \mathbf I$, see Finite strain theory) are $1, 1 + 2\gamma + \gamma^2$ and $1-2 \gamma + \gamma^2$. The volume change is given as $J = \det(F)=1-\gamma^2$, which is not unity. In literature, a volume preserving formulation for $F$ is used to denote pure shear in large deformation. This is written in the principal coordinate frame as:

$$F = \begin{bmatrix} \lambda & 0 &0 \\ 0 & 1 &0\\0&0&1/\lambda\end{bmatrix}$$

where $\lambda$ is the principal stretch.

== See also ==
- Simple shear
- Squeeze mapping
