= Simple shear =

Translation which preserves parallelism

Simple shear

Simple shear is a deformation in which parallel planes in a material remain parallel and maintain a constant distance, while translating relative to each other.

== In fluid mechanics ==
In fluid mechanics, simple shear is a special case of deformation where only one component of velocity vectors has a non-zero value:

$$V_x=f(x,y)$$

$$V_y=V_z=0$$

And the gradient of velocity is constant and perpendicular to the velocity itself:

$$\frac {\partial V_x} {\partial y} = \dot \gamma$$,

where $\dot \gamma$ is the shear rate and:

$$\frac {\partial V_x} {\partial x} = \frac {\partial V_x} {\partial z} = 0$$

The displacement gradient tensor Γ for this deformation has only one nonzero term:

$$\Gamma = \begin{bmatrix} 0 & {\dot \gamma} & 0 \\  0 & 0 & 0 \\ 0 & 0 & 0 \end{bmatrix}$$

Simple shear with the rate $\dot \gamma$ is the combination of pure shear strain with the rate of 1/2$\dot \gamma$ and rotation with the rate of 1/2$\dot \gamma$:

$$\Gamma =
\begin{matrix} \underbrace \begin{bmatrix} 0 & {\dot \gamma} & 0 \\  0 & 0 & 0 \\ 0 & 0 & 0 \end{bmatrix}
\\ \mbox{simple shear}\end{matrix} =
\begin{matrix} \underbrace \begin{bmatrix} 0 & {\tfrac12 \dot \gamma} & 0 \\  {\tfrac12 \dot \gamma} & 0 & 0 \\ 0 & 0 & 0 \end{bmatrix} \\ \mbox{pure shear} \end{matrix}
+ \begin{matrix} \underbrace \begin{bmatrix} 0 & {\tfrac12 \dot \gamma} & 0 \\  {- { \tfrac12 \dot \gamma}} & 0 & 0 \\ 0 & 0 & 0 \end{bmatrix} \\ \mbox{solid rotation} \end{matrix}$$

The mathematical model representing simple shear is a shear mapping restricted to the physical limits. It is an elementary linear transformation represented by a matrix. The model may represent laminar flow velocity at varying depths of a long channel with constant cross-section. Limited shear deformation is also used in vibration control, for instance base isolation of buildings for limiting earthquake damage.

== In solid mechanics ==
In solid mechanics, a simple shear deformation is defined as an isochoric plane deformation in which there are a set of line elements with a given reference orientation that do not change length and orientation during the deformation. This deformation is differentiated from a pure shear by virtue of the presence of a rigid rotation of the material. When rubber deforms under simple shear, its stress-strain behavior is approximately linear. A rod under torsion is a practical example for a body under simple shear.

If e_{1} is the fixed reference orientation in which line elements do not deform during the deformation and e_{1} − e_{2} is the plane of deformation, then the deformation gradient in simple shear can be expressed as

$$\boldsymbol{F} = \begin{bmatrix} 1 & \gamma & 0 \\ 0 & 1 & 0 \\ 0 & 0 & 1 \end{bmatrix}.$$

We can also write the deformation gradient as

$$\boldsymbol{F} = \boldsymbol{\mathit{1}} + \gamma\mathbf{e}_1\otimes\mathbf{e}_2.$$

=== Simple shear stress–strain relation ===
In linear elasticity, shear stress, denoted $\tau$, is related to shear strain, denoted $\gamma$, by the following equation:

$\tau = \gamma G\,$

where $G$ is the shear modulus of the material, given by

$G = \frac{E}{2(1+\nu)}$

Here $E$ is Young's modulus and $\nu$ is Poisson's ratio. Combining gives

$\tau = \frac{\gamma E}{2(1+\nu)}$

== See also ==
- Deformation (mechanics)
- Infinitesimal strain theory
- Finite strain theory
- Pure shear
