= Alternative stress measures =

In continuum mechanics, the most commonly used measure of stress is the Cauchy stress tensor, often called simply the stress tensor or "true stress". However, several alternative measures of stress can be defined:

1. The Kirchhoff stress ($\boldsymbol{\tau}$).
2. The nominal stress ($\boldsymbol{N}$).
3. The Piola–Kirchhoff stress tensors
  1. The first Piola–Kirchhoff stress ($\boldsymbol{P}$). This stress tensor is the transpose of the nominal stress ($\boldsymbol{P} = \boldsymbol{N}^T$).
  2. The second Piola–Kirchhoff stress or PK2 stress ($\boldsymbol{S}$).
4. The Biot stress ($\boldsymbol{T}$)

== Definitions ==
Consider the situation shown in the following figure. The following definitions use the notations shown in the figure.

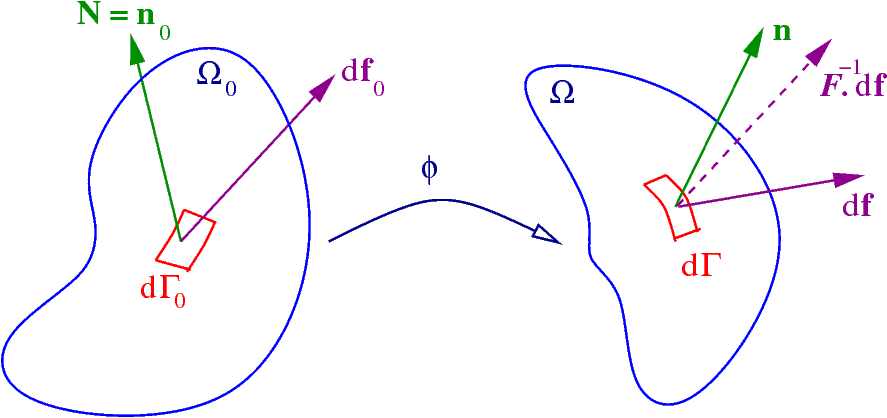
Quantities used in the definition of stress measures

In the reference configuration $\Omega_0$, the outward normal to a surface element $d\Gamma_0$ is $\mathbf{N} \equiv \mathbf{n}_0$ and the traction acting on that surface (assuming it deforms like a generic vector belonging to the deformation) is $\mathbf{t}_0$ leading to a force vector $d\mathbf{f}_0$. In the deformed configuration $\Omega$, the surface element changes to $d\Gamma$ with outward normal $\mathbf{n}$ and traction vector $\mathbf{t}$ leading to a force $d\mathbf{f}$. Note that this surface can either be a hypothetical cut inside the body or an actual surface. The quantity $\boldsymbol{F}$ is the deformation gradient tensor, $J$ is its determinant.

=== Cauchy stress ===
The Cauchy stress (or true stress) is a measure of the force acting on an element of area in the deformed configuration. This tensor is symmetric and is defined via

$$d\mathbf{f} = \mathbf{t}~d\Gamma = \boldsymbol{\sigma}^T\cdot\mathbf{n}~d\Gamma$$

or

$$\mathbf{t} = \boldsymbol{\sigma}^T\cdot\mathbf{n}$$

where $\mathbf{t}$ is the traction and $\mathbf{n}$ is the normal to the surface on which the traction acts.

=== Kirchhoff stress ===
The quantity,

$$\boldsymbol{\tau} = J~\boldsymbol{\sigma}$$

is called the Kirchhoff stress tensor, with $J$ the determinant of $\boldsymbol{F}$. It is used widely in numerical algorithms in metal plasticity (where there is no change in volume during plastic deformation). It can be called weighted Cauchy stress tensor as well.

=== Piola–Kirchhoff stress ===
==== Nominal stress/First Piola–Kirchhoff stress ====
The nominal stress $\boldsymbol{N}=\boldsymbol{P}^T$ is the transpose of the first Piola–Kirchhoff stress (PK1 stress, also called engineering stress) $\boldsymbol{P}$ and is defined via

$$d\mathbf{f} = \mathbf{t}~d\Gamma = \boldsymbol{N}^T\cdot\mathbf{n}_0~d\Gamma_0 = \boldsymbol{P}\cdot\mathbf{n}_0~d\Gamma_0$$

or

$$\mathbf{t}_0 =\mathbf{t}\dfrac{d{\Gamma}}{d\Gamma_0}= \boldsymbol{N}^T\cdot\mathbf{n}_0 = \boldsymbol{P}\cdot\mathbf{n}_0$$

This stress is unsymmetric and is a two-point tensor like the deformation gradient.
The asymmetry derives from the fact that, as a tensor, it has one index attached to the reference configuration and one to the deformed configuration.

==== Second Piola–Kirchhoff stress ====
If we pull back $d\mathbf{f}$ to the reference configuration we obtain the traction acting on that surface before the deformation $d\mathbf{f}_0$ assuming it behaves like a generic vector belonging to the deformation. In particular we have

$$d\mathbf{f}_0 = \boldsymbol{F}^{-1}\cdot d\mathbf{f}$$

or,

$$d\mathbf{f}_0 = \boldsymbol{F}^{-1}\cdot \boldsymbol{N}^T\cdot\mathbf{n}_0~d\Gamma_0
= \boldsymbol{F}^{-1}\cdot \mathbf{t}_0~d\Gamma_0$$

The PK2 stress ($\boldsymbol{S}$) is symmetric and is defined via the relation

$$d\mathbf{f}_0 = \boldsymbol{S}^T\cdot\mathbf{n}_0~d\Gamma_0 = \boldsymbol{F}^{-1}\cdot \mathbf{t}_0~d\Gamma_0$$

Therefore,

$$\boldsymbol{S}^T\cdot\mathbf{n}_0 = \boldsymbol{F}^{-1}\cdot\mathbf{t}_0$$

=== Biot stress ===
The Biot stress is useful because it is energy conjugate to the right stretch tensor $\boldsymbol{U}$. The Biot stress is defined as the symmetric part of the tensor $\boldsymbol{P}^T\cdot\boldsymbol{R}$ where $\boldsymbol{R}$ is the rotation tensor obtained from a polar decomposition of the deformation gradient. Therefore, the Biot stress tensor is defined as

$$\boldsymbol{T} = \tfrac{1}{2}(\boldsymbol{R}^T\cdot\boldsymbol{P} + \boldsymbol{P}^T\cdot\boldsymbol{R}) ~.$$

The Biot stress is also called the Jaumann stress.

The quantity $\boldsymbol{T}$ does not have any physical interpretation. However, the unsymmetrized Biot stress has the interpretation

$$\boldsymbol{R}^T~d\mathbf{f} = (\boldsymbol{P}^T\cdot\boldsymbol{R})^T\cdot\mathbf{n}_0~d\Gamma_0$$

== Relations ==
=== Relations between Cauchy stress and nominal stress ===
From Nanson's formula relating areas in the reference and deformed configurations:

$$\mathbf{n}~d\Gamma = J~\boldsymbol{F}^{-T}\cdot\mathbf{n}_0~d\Gamma_0$$

Now,

$$\boldsymbol{\sigma}^T\cdot\mathbf{n}~d\Gamma = d\mathbf{f} = \boldsymbol{N}^T\cdot\mathbf{n}_0~d\Gamma_0$$

Hence,

$$\boldsymbol{\sigma}^T\cdot (J~\boldsymbol{F}^{-T}\cdot\mathbf{n}_0~d\Gamma_0) =  \boldsymbol{N}^T\cdot\mathbf{n}_0~d\Gamma_0$$

or,

$$\boldsymbol{N}^T = J~(\boldsymbol{F}^{-1}\cdot\boldsymbol{\sigma})^T = J~\boldsymbol{\sigma}^T\cdot\boldsymbol{F}^{-T}$$

or,

$$\boldsymbol{N} = J~\boldsymbol{F}^{-1}\cdot\boldsymbol{\sigma} \qquad \text{and} \qquad
\boldsymbol{N}^T = \boldsymbol{P} = J~\boldsymbol{\sigma}^T\cdot\boldsymbol{F}^{-T}$$

In index notation,

$$N_{Ij} = J~F_{Ik}^{-1}~\sigma_{kj} \qquad \text{and} \qquad
P_{iJ} = J~\sigma_{ki}~F^{-1}_{Jk}$$

Therefore,

$$J~\boldsymbol{\sigma} = \boldsymbol{F}\cdot\boldsymbol{N} = \boldsymbol{F}\cdot\boldsymbol{P}^T~.$$

Note that $\boldsymbol{N}$ and $\boldsymbol{P}$ are (generally) not symmetric because $\boldsymbol{F}$ is (generally) not symmetric.

=== Relations between nominal stress and second P–K stress ===
Recall that

$$\boldsymbol{N}^T\cdot\mathbf{n}_0~d\Gamma_0 = d\mathbf{f}$$

and

$$d\mathbf{f} = \boldsymbol{F}\cdot d\mathbf{f}_0 = \boldsymbol{F} \cdot (\boldsymbol{S}^T \cdot \mathbf{n}_0~d\Gamma_0)$$

Therefore,

$$\boldsymbol{N}^T\cdot\mathbf{n}_0 = \boldsymbol{F}\cdot\boldsymbol{S}^T\cdot\mathbf{n}_0$$

or (using the symmetry of $\boldsymbol{S}$),

$$\boldsymbol{N} = \boldsymbol{S}\cdot\boldsymbol{F}^T  \qquad \text{and} \qquad
\boldsymbol{P} = \boldsymbol{F}\cdot\boldsymbol{S}$$

In index notation,

$$N_{Ij} = S_{IK}~F^T_{jK} \qquad \text{and} \qquad P_{iJ} = F_{iK}~S_{KJ}$$

Alternatively, we can write

$$\boldsymbol{S} = \boldsymbol{N}\cdot\boldsymbol{F}^{-T} \qquad \text{and} \qquad
\boldsymbol{S} = \boldsymbol{F}^{-1}\cdot\boldsymbol{P}$$

=== Relations between Cauchy stress and second P–K stress ===
Recall that

$$\boldsymbol{N} = J~\boldsymbol{F}^{-1}\cdot\boldsymbol{\sigma}$$

In terms of the 2nd PK stress, we have

$$\boldsymbol{S}\cdot\boldsymbol{F}^T = J~\boldsymbol{F}^{-1}\cdot\boldsymbol{\sigma}$$

Therefore,

$$\boldsymbol{S} = J~\boldsymbol{F}^{-1}\cdot\boldsymbol{\sigma}\cdot\boldsymbol{F}^{-T} = \boldsymbol{F}^{-1}\cdot\boldsymbol{\tau}\cdot\boldsymbol{F}^{-T}$$

In index notation,

$$S_{IJ} = F_{Ik}^{-1}~\tau_{kl}~F_{Jl}^{-1}$$

Since the Cauchy stress (and hence the Kirchhoff stress) is symmetric, the 2nd PK stress is also symmetric.

Alternatively, we can write

$$\boldsymbol{\sigma} = J^{-1}~\boldsymbol{F}\cdot\boldsymbol{S}\cdot\boldsymbol{F}^T$$

or,

$$\boldsymbol{\tau} = \boldsymbol{F}\cdot\boldsymbol{S}\cdot\boldsymbol{F}^T ~.$$

Clearly, from definition of the push-forward and pull-back operations, we have

$$\boldsymbol{S} = \varphi^{*}[\boldsymbol{\tau}] = \boldsymbol{F}^{-1}\cdot\boldsymbol{\tau}\cdot\boldsymbol{F}^{-T}$$

and

$$\boldsymbol{\tau} = \varphi_{*}[\boldsymbol{S}] = \boldsymbol{F}\cdot\boldsymbol{S}\cdot\boldsymbol{F}^T~.$$

Therefore, $\boldsymbol{S}$ is the pull back of $\boldsymbol{\tau}$ by $\boldsymbol{F}$ and $\boldsymbol{\tau}$ is the push forward of $\boldsymbol{S}$.

=== Summary of conversion formula ===
Key: $J=\det\left(\boldsymbol{F}\right),\quad\boldsymbol{C}=\boldsymbol{F}^{T}\boldsymbol{F}=\boldsymbol{U}^{2},\quad\boldsymbol{F}=\boldsymbol{R}\boldsymbol{U},\quad \boldsymbol{R}^T=\boldsymbol{R}^{-1},$ $\boldsymbol{P}=J\boldsymbol{\sigma}\boldsymbol{F}^{-T},\quad\boldsymbol{\tau}=J\boldsymbol{\sigma},\quad \boldsymbol{S}=J\boldsymbol{F}^{-1}\boldsymbol{\sigma}\boldsymbol{F}^{-T},\quad\boldsymbol{T}=\boldsymbol{R}^{T}\boldsymbol{P},\quad \boldsymbol{M}=\boldsymbol{C}\boldsymbol{S}$

Conversion formulae
Equation for	$\boldsymbol{\sigma}$	$\boldsymbol{\tau}$	$\boldsymbol{P}$	$\boldsymbol{S}$	$\boldsymbol{T}$	$\boldsymbol{M}$
$\boldsymbol{\sigma}=\,$	$\boldsymbol{\sigma}$	$J^{-1}\boldsymbol{\tau}$	$J^{-1}\boldsymbol{P}\boldsymbol{F}^{T}$	$J^{-1}\boldsymbol{F}\boldsymbol{S}\boldsymbol{F}^{T}$	$J^{-1}\boldsymbol{R}\boldsymbol{T}\boldsymbol{F}^{T}$	$J^{-1}\boldsymbol{F}^{-T}\boldsymbol{M}\boldsymbol{F}^{T}$ (non isotropy)
$\boldsymbol{\tau}=\,$	$J\boldsymbol{\sigma}$	$\boldsymbol{\tau}$	$\boldsymbol{P}\boldsymbol{F}^{T}$	$\boldsymbol{F}\boldsymbol{S}\boldsymbol{F}^{T}$	$\boldsymbol{R}\boldsymbol{T}\boldsymbol{F}^{T}$	$\boldsymbol{F}^{-T}\boldsymbol{M}\boldsymbol{F}^{T}$ (non isotropy)
$\boldsymbol{P}=\,$	$J\boldsymbol{\sigma}\boldsymbol{F}^{-T}$	$\boldsymbol{\tau}\boldsymbol{F}^{-T}$	$\boldsymbol{P}$	$\boldsymbol{F}\boldsymbol{S}$	$\boldsymbol{R}\boldsymbol{T}$	$\boldsymbol{F}^{-T}\boldsymbol{M}$
$\boldsymbol{S}=\,$	$J\boldsymbol{F}^{-1}\boldsymbol{\sigma}\boldsymbol{F}^{-T}$	$\boldsymbol{F}^{-1}\boldsymbol{\tau}\boldsymbol{F}^{-T}$	$\boldsymbol{F}^{-1}\boldsymbol{P}$	$\boldsymbol{S}$	$\boldsymbol{U}^{-1}\boldsymbol{T}$	$\boldsymbol{C}^{-1}\boldsymbol{M}$
$\boldsymbol{T}=\,$	$J\boldsymbol{R}^{T}\boldsymbol{\sigma}\boldsymbol{F}^{-T}$	$\boldsymbol{R}^{T}\boldsymbol{\tau}\boldsymbol{F}^{-T}$	$\boldsymbol{R}^{T}\boldsymbol{P}$	$\boldsymbol{U}\boldsymbol{S}$	$\boldsymbol{T}$	$\boldsymbol{U}^{-1}\boldsymbol{M}$
$\boldsymbol{M}=\,$	$J\boldsymbol{F}^{T}\boldsymbol{\sigma}\boldsymbol{F}^{-T}$ (non isotropy)	$\boldsymbol{F}^{T}\boldsymbol{\tau}\boldsymbol{F}^{-T}$ (non isotropy)	$\boldsymbol{F}^{T}\boldsymbol{P}$	$\boldsymbol{C}\boldsymbol{S}$	$\boldsymbol{U}\boldsymbol{T}$	$\boldsymbol{M}$

== See also ==
- Stress (physics)
- Finite strain theory
- Continuum mechanics
- Hyperelastic material
- Cauchy elastic material
- Critical plane analysis
