= Finite strain theory =

Mathematical model for describing material deformation under stress

In continuum mechanics, the finite strain theory—also called large strain theory, or large deformation theory—deals with deformations in which strains and/or rotations are large enough to invalidate assumptions inherent in infinitesimal strain theory. In this case, the undeformed and deformed configurations of the continuum are significantly different, requiring a clear distinction between them. This is commonly the case with elastomers, plastically deforming materials and other fluids and biological soft tissue.

== Displacement field ==
Figure 1. Motion of a continuum body.

The displacement of a body has two components: a rigid-body displacement and a deformation.

- A rigid-body displacement consists of a translation and rotation of the body without changing its shape or size.
- Deformation implies the change in shape and/or size of the body from an initial or undeformed configuration $\kappa_0(\mathcal B)$ to a current or deformed configuration $\kappa_t(\mathcal B)$ (Figure 1).

A change in the configuration of a continuum body can be described by a displacement field. A displacement field is a vector field of all displacement vectors for all particles in the body, which relates the deformed configuration with the undeformed configuration. The distance between any two particles changes if and only if deformation has occurred. If displacement occurs without deformation, then it is a rigid-body displacement.

== Deformation gradient tensor ==
Figure 2. Deformation of a continuum body.

The deformation gradient tensor is a quantity related to both the reference and current configuration, and expresses motion locally around a point. Two types of deformation gradient tensor may be defined.

The material deformation gradient tensor $\mathbf F(\mathbf X,t) = F_{jK} \mathbf e_j\otimes\mathbf I_K$ is a second-order tensor that represents the gradient of the smooth and invertible mapping function $\chi(\mathbf X,t)\,\!$, which describes the motion of a continuum. In particular, the continuity of the mapping function $\chi(\mathbf X,t)\,\!$ implies that cracks and voids do not open or close during the deformation. The material deformation gradient tensor characterizes the local deformation at a material point with position vector $\mathbf X\,\!$, i.e., deformation at neighbouring points, by transforming (linear transformation) a material line element emanating from that point from the reference configuration to the current or deformed configuration. Thus we have,
$$\begin{align}
d\mathbf{x} &= \frac {\partial \mathbf{x}} {\partial \mathbf {X}}\,d\mathbf{X}
\qquad &\text{or}& \qquad
dx_j =\frac{\partial x_j}{\partial X_K}\,dX_K \\
&= \nabla \chi(\mathbf X,t) \,d\mathbf{X}
\qquad &\text{or}& \qquad
dx_j =F_{jK}\,dX_K \,. \\
& = \mathbf F(\mathbf X,t) \,d\mathbf{X}
\end{align}$$

Assuming that $\chi(\mathbf X,t)\,\!$ has a smooth inverse, $\mathbf F$ has the inverse $\mathbf H = \mathbf F^{-1} = \frac {\partial \mathbf{X}} {\partial \mathbf {x}}\,\!$, which is the spatial deformation gradient tensor. $\mathbf F$ being invertible is equivalent to $\text{det}\mathbf F \neq 0$, which corresponds to the notion that the material cannot be infinitely compressed.

=== Relative displacement vector ===
Consider a particle or material point $P$ with position vector $\mathbf X = X_I \mathbf I_I$ in the undeformed configuration (Figure 2). After a displacement of the body, the new position of the particle indicated by $p$ in the new configuration is given by the vector position $\mathbf{x} = x_i \mathbf e_i\,\!$. The coordinate systems for the undeformed and deformed configuration can be superimposed for convenience.

Consider now a material point $Q$ neighboring $P\,\!$, with position vector $\mathbf{X}+ \Delta \mathbf{X} = (X_I+\Delta X_I) \mathbf I_I\,\!$. In the deformed configuration this particle has a new position $q$ given by the position vector $\mathbf{x}+ \Delta \mathbf{x}\,\!$. Assuming that the line segments $\Delta X$ and $\Delta \mathbf x$ joining the particles $P$ and $Q$ in both the undeformed and deformed configuration, respectively, to be very small, then we can express them as $d\mathbf X$ and $d\mathbf x\,\!$. Thus from Figure 2 we have
$$\begin{align}
\mathbf{x} &= \mathbf{X} +\mathbf{u}(\mathbf{X}),
\\
\mathbf{x}+ d\mathbf{x} &= \mathbf{X}+d\mathbf{X}+\mathbf{u}(\mathbf{X}+d\mathbf{X}),
\\
\text{and}\text{ therefore}&
\\
d\mathbf{x} &= \mathbf{X}-\mathbf{x}+d\mathbf{X}+ \mathbf{u}(\mathbf{X}+d\mathbf{X}) \\
&= d\mathbf{X}+\mathbf{u}(\mathbf{X}+d\mathbf{X})- \mathbf{u}(\mathbf{X}) \\
&= d\mathbf{X}+d\mathbf{u} \\
\end{align},$$

where $\mathbf {du}$ is the relative displacement vector, which represents the relative displacement of $Q$ with respect to $P$ in the deformed configuration.

==== Taylor approximation ====
For an infinitesimal element $d\mathbf X\,\!$, and assuming continuity on the displacement field, it is possible to use a Taylor series expansion around point $P\,\!$, neglecting higher-order terms, to approximate the components of the relative displacement vector for the neighboring particle $Q$ as
$$\begin{align}
\mathbf{u}(\mathbf{X}+d\mathbf{X}) &= \mathbf{u}(\mathbf{X})+d\mathbf{u} \quad & \text{or} & \quad u_i^* = u_i+du_i \\
&\approx \mathbf{u}(\mathbf{X})+\nabla_{\mathbf X}\mathbf u\cdot d\mathbf X \quad & \text{or} & \quad u_i^* \approx u_i + \frac{\partial u_i}{\partial X_J}dX_J \,.
\end{align}$$
Thus, the previous equation $d\mathbf x = d\mathbf{X} + d\mathbf{u}$ can be written as
$$\begin{align}
d\mathbf x&=d\mathbf X+d\mathbf u \\
&=d\mathbf X+\nabla_{\mathbf X}\mathbf u\cdot d\mathbf X\\
&=\left(\mathbf I + \nabla_{\mathbf X}\mathbf u\right)d\mathbf X\\
&=\mathbf F d\mathbf X
\end{align}$$

=== Time-derivative of the deformation gradient ===
Calculations that involve the time-dependent deformation of a body often require a time derivative of the deformation gradient to be calculated. A geometrically consistent definition of such a derivative requires an excursion into differential geometry but we avoid those issues in this article.

The time derivative of $\mathbf{F}$ is
$$\dot{\mathbf{F}} = \frac{\partial \mathbf{F}}{\partial t} = \frac{\partial}{\partial t} \left[\frac{\partial \mathbf{x}(\mathbf{X}, t)}{\partial \mathbf{X}}\right] = \frac{\partial}{\partial \mathbf{X}}\left[\frac{\partial \mathbf{x}(\mathbf{X}, t)}{\partial t}\right] = \frac{\partial}{\partial \mathbf{X}}\left[\mathbf{V}(\mathbf{X}, t)\right]$$
where $\mathbf{V}$ is the (material) velocity. The derivative on the right hand side represents a material velocity gradient. It is common to convert that into a spatial gradient by applying the chain rule for derivatives, i.e.,
$$\dot{\mathbf{F}} =
\frac{\partial}{\partial \mathbf{X}}\left[\mathbf{V}(\mathbf{X}, t)\right] =
\frac{\partial}{\partial \mathbf{X}}\left[\mathbf{v}(\mathbf{x}(\mathbf{X}, t),t)\right] =
\left.\frac{\partial}{\partial \mathbf{x}}\left[\mathbf{v}(\mathbf{x},t)\right]\right|_{\mathbf{x} = \mathbf{x}(\mathbf{X}, t)} \cdot
\frac{\partial \mathbf{x}(\mathbf{X}, t)}{\partial \mathbf{X}}
= \boldsymbol{l}\cdot\mathbf{F}$$
where $\boldsymbol{l} = (\nabla_{\mathbf{x}} \mathbf{v})^T$ is the spatial velocity gradient and where $\mathbf{v}(\mathbf{x},t) = \mathbf{V}(\mathbf{X},t)$ is the spatial (Eulerian) velocity at $\mathbf{x} = \mathbf{x}(\mathbf{X}, t)$. If the spatial velocity gradient is constant in time, the above equation can be solved exactly to give
$$\mathbf{F} = e^{\boldsymbol{l}\, t}$$
assuming $\mathbf{F} = \mathbf{1}$ at $t = 0$. There are several methods of computing the exponential above.

Related quantities often used in continuum mechanics are the rate of deformation tensor and the spin tensor defined, respectively, as:
$$\boldsymbol{d} = \tfrac{1}{2} \left(\boldsymbol{l} + \boldsymbol{l}^T\right) \,,~~
\boldsymbol{w} = \tfrac{1}{2} \left(\boldsymbol{l} - \boldsymbol{l}^T\right) \,.$$
The rate of deformation tensor gives the rate of stretching of line elements while the spin tensor indicates the rate of rotation or vorticity of the motion.

The material time derivative of the inverse of the deformation gradient (keeping the reference configuration fixed) is often required in analyses that involve finite strains. This derivative is
$$\frac{\partial}{\partial t} \left(\mathbf{F}^{-1}\right) = - \mathbf{F}^{-1} \cdot \dot{\mathbf{F}} \cdot \mathbf{F}^{-1} \,.$$
The above relation can be verified by taking the material time derivative of $\mathbf{F}^{-1} \cdot d\mathbf{x} = d\mathbf{X}$ and noting that $\dot{\mathbf{X}} = 0$.

=== Polar decomposition of the deformation gradient tensor ===
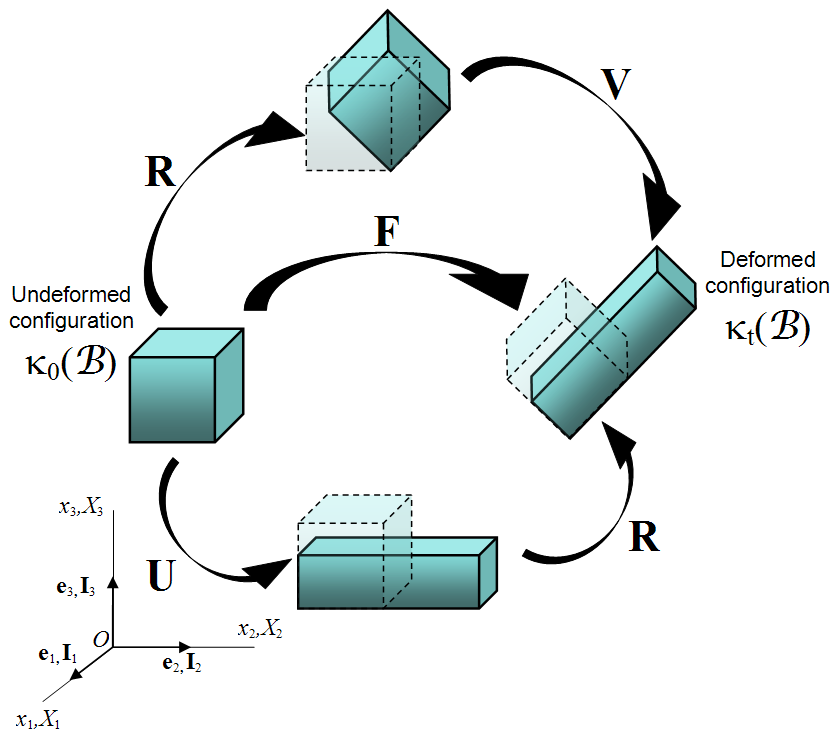
Figure 3. Representation of the polar decomposition of the deformation gradient.

The deformation gradient $\mathbf{F}$, like any invertible second-order tensor, can be decomposed, using the polar decomposition theorem, into a product of two second-order tensors (Truesdell and Noll, 1965): an orthogonal tensor and a positive definite symmetric tensor, i.e.,
$$\mathbf{F} = \mathbf{R} \mathbf{U} = \mathbf{V} \mathbf{R}$$
where the tensor $\mathbf{R}$ is a proper orthogonal tensor, i.e., $\mathbf R^{-1} = \mathbf R^T$ and $\det \mathbf R = +1\,\!$, representing a rotation; the tensor $\mathbf{U}$ is the right stretch tensor; and $\mathbf{V}$ the left stretch tensor. The terms right and left means that they are to the right and left of the rotation tensor $\mathbf{R}\,\!$, respectively. $\mathbf{U}$ and $\mathbf{V}$ are both positive definite, i.e. $\mathbf x \cdot \mathbf U \cdot \mathbf x > 0$ and $\mathbf x\cdot\mathbf V \cdot \mathbf x > 0$ for all non-zero $\mathbf x \in \R^3$, and symmetric tensors, i.e. $\mathbf U = \mathbf U^T$ and $\mathbf V = \mathbf V^T\,\!$, of second order.

This decomposition implies that the deformation of a line element $d\mathbf X$ in the undeformed configuration onto $d\mathbf x$ in the deformed configuration, i.e., $d\mathbf x = \mathbf F \,d\mathbf X\,\!$, may be obtained either by first stretching the element by $\mathbf U\,\!$, i.e. $d\mathbf x' = \mathbf U \,d\mathbf X\,\!$, followed by a rotation $\mathbf R\,\!$, i.e., $d\mathbf x = \mathbf R \,d\mathbf x'\,\!$; or equivalently, by applying a rigid rotation $\mathbf R$ first, i.e., $d\mathbf x' = \mathbf R \, d\mathbf X\,\!$, followed later by a stretching $\mathbf V\,\!$, i.e., $d\mathbf x = \mathbf V \, d\mathbf x'$ (See Figure 3).

Due to the orthogonality of $\mathbf R$
$$\mathbf V = \mathbf R \cdot \mathbf U \cdot \mathbf R^T$$
so that $\mathbf U$ and $\mathbf V$ have the same eigenvalues or principal stretches, but different eigenvectors or principal directions $\mathbf{N}_i$ and $\mathbf{n}_i\,\!$, respectively. The principal directions are related by
$$\mathbf{n}_i = \mathbf{R} \mathbf{N}_i.$$

This polar decomposition, which is unique as $\mathbf F$ is invertible with a positive determinant, is a corollary of the singular-value decomposition.

=== Transformation of a surface and volume element ===
To transform quantities that are defined with respect to areas in a deformed configuration to those relative to areas in a reference configuration, and vice versa, we use Nanson's relation, expressed as
$$da~\mathbf{n} = J~dA ~\mathbf{F}^{-T} \cdot \mathbf{N}$$
where $da$ is an area of a region in the deformed configuration, $dA$ is the same area in the reference configuration, and $\mathbf{n}$ is the outward normal to the area element in the current configuration while $\mathbf{N}$ is the outward normal in the reference configuration, $\mathbf{F}$ is the deformation gradient, and $J = \det\mathbf{F}\,\!$.

The corresponding formula for the transformation of the volume element is
$$dv = J~dV$$

Derivation of Nanson's relation (see also)

To see how this formula is derived, we start with the oriented area elements in the reference and current configurations:
$$d\mathbf{A} = dA~\mathbf{N} ~;~~ d\mathbf{a} = da~\mathbf{n}$$
The reference and current volumes of an element are
$$dV = d\mathbf{A}^{T}\cdot d\mathbf{L} ~;~~ dv = d\mathbf{a}^{T} \cdot d\mathbf{l}$$
where $d\mathbf{l} = \mathbf{F}\cdot d\mathbf{L}\,\!$.

Therefore,
$$d\mathbf{a}^{T} \cdot d\mathbf{l}= dv = J~dV = J~d\mathbf{A}^{T}\cdot d\mathbf{L}$$
or,
$$d\mathbf{a}^{T} \cdot \mathbf{F}\cdot d\mathbf{L} = dv = J~dV = J~d\mathbf{A}^{T} \cdot d\mathbf{L}$$
so,
$$d\mathbf{a}^{T} \cdot \mathbf{F} = J~d\mathbf{A}^{T}$$
So we get
$$d\mathbf{a} = J~\mathbf{F}^{-T} \cdot d\mathbf{A}$$
or,
$$da~\mathbf{n} = J~dA~\mathbf{F}^{-T} \cdot \mathbf{N}$$
Q.E.D.

== Fundamental strain tensors ==
A strain tensor is defined by the IUPAC as:

"A symmetric tensor that results when a deformation gradient tensor is factorized into a rotation tensor followed or preceded by a symmetric tensor".

Since a pure rotation should not induce any strains in a deformable body, it is often convenient to use rotation-independent measures of deformation in continuum mechanics. As a rotation followed by its inverse rotation leads to no change ($\mathbf{R}\mathbf{R}^T=\mathbf{R}^T\mathbf{R}=\mathbf{I}\,\!$) we can exclude the rotation by multiplying the deformation gradient tensor $\mathbf{F}$ by its transpose.

Several rotation-independent deformation gradient tensors (or "deformation tensors", for short) are used in mechanics. In solid mechanics, the most popular of these are the right and left Cauchy–Green deformation tensors.

=== Cauchy strain tensor (right Cauchy–Green deformation tensor) ===
In 1839, George Green introduced a deformation tensor known as the right Cauchy–Green deformation tensor or Green's deformation tensor (the IUPAC recommends that this tensor be called the Cauchy strain tensor), defined as:

$$\mathbf C=\mathbf F^T\mathbf F=\mathbf U^2 \qquad \text{or} \qquad C_{IJ}=F_{kI}~F_{kJ} = \frac {\partial x_k} {\partial X_I} \frac {\partial x_k} {\partial X_J}.$$

Physically, the Cauchy–Green tensor gives us the square of local change in distances due to deformation, i.e. $d\mathbf x^2=d\mathbf X\cdot\mathbf C \cdot d\mathbf X$

Invariants of $\mathbf{C}$ are often used in the expressions for strain energy density functions. The most commonly used invariants are
$$\begin{align}
I_1^C & := \text{tr}(\mathbf{C}) = C_{II} = \lambda_1^2 + \lambda_2^2 + \lambda_3^2 \\
I_2^C & := \tfrac{1}{2}\left[(\text{tr}~\mathbf{C})^2 - \text{tr}(\mathbf{C}^2) \right]
= \tfrac{1}{2}\left[(C_{JJ})^2 - C_{IK}C_{KI}\right] = \lambda_1^2\lambda_2^2 + \lambda_2^2\lambda_3^2 + \lambda_3^2\lambda_1^2 \\
I_3^C & := \det(\mathbf{C}) = J^2 = \lambda_1^2\lambda_2^2\lambda_3^2.
\end{align}$$
where $J:=\det\mathbf{F}$ is the determinant of the deformation gradient $\mathbf{F}$ and $\lambda_i$ are stretch ratios for the unit fibers that are initially oriented along the eigenvector directions of the right (reference) stretch tensor (these are not generally aligned with the three axes of the coordinate systems).

=== Finger strain tensor ===
The IUPAC recommends that the inverse of the right Cauchy–Green deformation tensor (called the Cauchy strain tensor in that document), i. e., $\mathbf C^{-1}$, be called the Finger strain tensor. However, that nomenclature is not universally accepted in applied mechanics.

$$\mathbf{f}=\mathbf C^{-1}=\mathbf F^{-1}\mathbf F^{-T} \qquad \text{or} \qquad f_{IJ}=\frac {\partial X_I} {\partial x_k} \frac {\partial X_J} {\partial x_k}$$

=== Green strain tensor (left Cauchy–Green deformation tensor) ===
Reversing the order of multiplication in the formula for the right Cauchy-Green deformation tensor leads to the left Cauchy–Green deformation tensor which is defined as:
$$\mathbf B = \mathbf F\mathbf F^T = \mathbf V^2 \qquad \text{or} \qquad B_{ij} = \frac {\partial x_i} {\partial X_K} \frac {\partial x_j} {\partial X_K}$$

The left Cauchy–Green deformation tensor is often called the Finger deformation tensor, named after Josef Finger (1894).

The IUPAC recommends that this tensor be called the Green strain tensor.

Invariants of $\mathbf{B}$ are also used in the expressions for strain energy density functions. The conventional invariants are defined as
$$\begin{align}
I_1 & := \text{tr}(\mathbf{B}) = B_{ii} = \lambda_1^2 + \lambda_2^2 + \lambda_3^2\\
I_2 & := \tfrac{1}{2}\left[(\text{tr}~\mathbf{B})^2 - \text{tr}(\mathbf{B}^2)\right]
= \tfrac{1}{2}\left(B_{ii}^2 - B_{jk}B_{kj}\right) = \lambda_1^2\lambda_2^2 + \lambda_2^2\lambda_3^2 + \lambda_3^2\lambda_1^2 \\
I_3 & := \det\mathbf{B} = J^2 = \lambda_1^2\lambda_2^2\lambda_3^2
\end{align}$$
where $J:=\det\mathbf{F}$ is the determinant of the deformation gradient.

For compressible materials, a slightly different set of invariants is used:
$$(\bar{I}_1 := J^{-2/3} I_1 ~;~~ \bar{I}_2 := J^{-4/3} I_2 ~;~~ J\neq 1) ~.$$

=== Piola strain tensor (Cauchy deformation tensor) ===
Earlier in 1828, Augustin-Louis Cauchy introduced a deformation tensor defined as the inverse of the left Cauchy–Green deformation tensor, $\mathbf B^{-1}\,\!$. This tensor has also been called the Piola strain tensor by the IUPAC and the Finger tensor in the rheology and fluid dynamics literature.

$$\mathbf{c}=\mathbf B^{-1}=\mathbf F^{-1 T}\mathbf F^{-1} \qquad \text{or} \qquad c_{ij}=\frac {\partial X_K} {\partial x_i} \frac {\partial X_K} {\partial x_j}$$

=== Spectral representation ===
If there are three distinct principal stretches $\lambda_i \,\!$, the spectral decompositions of $\mathbf{C}$ and $\mathbf{B}$ is given by

$$\mathbf{C} = \sum_{i=1}^3 \lambda_i^2 \mathbf{N}_i \otimes \mathbf{N}_i \qquad \text{and} \qquad \mathbf{B} = \sum_{i=1}^3 \lambda_i^2 \mathbf{n}_i \otimes \mathbf{n}_i$$

Furthermore,

$$\mathbf U = \sum_{i=1}^3 \lambda_i \mathbf N_i \otimes \mathbf N_i ~;~~
\mathbf V = \sum_{i=1}^3 \lambda_i \mathbf n_i \otimes \mathbf n_i$$
$$\mathbf R = \sum_{i=1}^3 \mathbf n_i \otimes \mathbf N_i ~;~~
\mathbf F = \sum_{i=1}^3 \lambda_i \mathbf n_i \otimes \mathbf N_i$$

Observe that
$$\mathbf{V} = \mathbf{R}~\mathbf{U}~\mathbf{R}^T =
\sum_{i=1}^3 \lambda_i~\mathbf{R}~(\mathbf{N}_i\otimes\mathbf{N}_i)~\mathbf{R}^T =
\sum_{i=1}^3 \lambda_i~(\mathbf{R}~\mathbf{N}_i)\otimes(\mathbf{R}~\mathbf{N}_i)$$
Therefore, the uniqueness of the spectral decomposition also implies that $\mathbf{n}_i = \mathbf{R}~\mathbf{N}_i \,\!$. The left stretch ($\mathbf{V}\,\!$) is also called the spatial stretch tensor while the right stretch ($\mathbf{U}\,\!$) is called the material stretch tensor.

The effect of $\mathbf{F}$ acting on $\mathbf{N}_i$ is to stretch the vector by $\lambda_i$ and to rotate it to the new orientation $\mathbf{n}_i\,\!$, i.e.,
$$\mathbf{F}~\mathbf{N}_i = \lambda_i~(\mathbf{R}~\mathbf{N}_i) = \lambda_i~\mathbf{n}_i$$
In a similar vein,
$$\mathbf{F}^{-T}~\mathbf{N}_i = \cfrac{1}{\lambda_i}~\mathbf{n}_i ~;~~
\mathbf{F}^T~\mathbf{n}_i = \lambda_i~\mathbf{N}_i ~;~~
\mathbf{F}^{-1}~\mathbf{n}_i = \cfrac{1}{\lambda_i}~\mathbf{N}_i ~.$$

==== Examples ====
Uniaxial extension of an incompressible material
This is the case where a specimen is stretched in 1-direction with a stretch ratio of $\mathbf{\alpha=\alpha_1}\,\!$. If the volume remains constant, the contraction in the other two directions is such that $\mathbf{\alpha_1 \alpha_2 \alpha_3 =1}$ or $\mathbf{\alpha_2=\alpha_3=\alpha^{-0.5}}\,\!$. Then:
$$\mathbf{F}=\begin{bmatrix}
\alpha & 0 & 0 \\
0 & \alpha^{-0.5} & 0 \\
0 & 0 & \alpha^{-0.5}
\end{bmatrix}$$
$$\mathbf{B} = \mathbf{C} = \begin{bmatrix}
\alpha^2 & 0 & 0 \\
0 & \alpha^{-1} & 0 \\
0 & 0 & \alpha^{-1}
\end{bmatrix}$$
Simple shear
$$\mathbf{F}=\begin{bmatrix}
1 & \gamma & 0 \\
0 & 1 & 0 \\
0 & 0 & 1
\end{bmatrix}$$
$$\mathbf{B} = \begin{bmatrix}
1+\gamma^2 & \gamma & 0 \\
\gamma & 1 & 0 \\
0 & 0 & 1
\end{bmatrix}$$
$$\mathbf{C} = \begin{bmatrix}
1 & \gamma & 0 \\
\gamma & 1+\gamma^2 & 0 \\
0 & 0 & 1
\end{bmatrix}$$
Rigid body rotation
$$\mathbf{F} = \begin{bmatrix}
\cos \theta & \sin \theta & 0 \\
- \sin \theta & \cos \theta & 0 \\
0 & 0 & 1
\end{bmatrix}$$
$$\mathbf{B} = \mathbf{C} = \begin{bmatrix}
1 & 0 & 0 \\
0 & 1 & 0 \\
0 & 0 & 1
\end{bmatrix} = \mathbf{1}$$

=== Derivatives of stretch ===
Derivatives of the stretch with respect to the right Cauchy–Green deformation tensor are used to derive the stress-strain relations of many solids, particularly hyperelastic materials. These derivatives are
$$\cfrac{\partial\lambda_i}{\partial\mathbf{C}} =
\cfrac{1}{2\lambda_i}~\mathbf{N}_i\otimes\mathbf{N}_i =
\cfrac{1}{2\lambda_i}~\mathbf{R}^T~(\mathbf{n}_i\otimes\mathbf{n}_i)~\mathbf{R} ~;~~ i=1,2,3$$
and follow from the observations that
$$\mathbf{C}:(\mathbf{N}_i\otimes\mathbf{N}_i) = \lambda_i^2 ~;~~~~\cfrac{\partial\mathbf{C}}{\partial\mathbf{C}} = \mathsf{I}^{(s)} ~;~~~~ \mathsf{I}^{(s)}:(\mathbf{N}_i\otimes\mathbf{N}_i)=\mathbf{N}_i\otimes\mathbf{N}_i.$$

=== Physical interpretation of deformation tensors ===
Let $\mathbf{X} = X^i~\boldsymbol{E}_i$ be a Cartesian coordinate system defined on the undeformed body and let $\mathbf{x} = x^i~\boldsymbol{E}_i$ be another system defined on the deformed body. Let a curve $\mathbf{X}(s)$ in the undeformed body be parametrized using $s \in [0,1]$. Its image in the deformed body is $\mathbf{x}(\mathbf{X}(s))$.

The undeformed length of the curve is given by
$$l_X
= \int_0^1 \left| \cfrac{d \mathbf{X}}{d s} \right|~ds
= \int_0^1 \sqrt{ \cfrac{d \mathbf{X}}{d s}\cdot\cfrac{d \mathbf{X}}{d s}}~ds
= \int_0^1 \sqrt{ \cfrac{d \mathbf{X}}{d s}\cdot\boldsymbol{I} \cdot\cfrac{d \mathbf{X}}{d s} }~ds$$
After deformation, the length becomes
$$\begin{align}
l_x & = \int_0^1 \left| \cfrac{d \mathbf{x}}{d s} \right|~ds
= \int_0^1 \sqrt{\cfrac{d \mathbf{x}}{d s}\cdot\cfrac{d \mathbf{x}}{d s}}~ds
= \int_0^1 \sqrt{
\left(\cfrac{d \mathbf{x}}{d \mathbf{X}}\cdot\cfrac{d \mathbf{X}}{d s}\right)
\cdot
\left(\cfrac{d \mathbf{x}}{d \mathbf{X}}\cdot\cfrac{d \mathbf{X}}{d s}\right)}~ds
\\
& = \int_0^1 \sqrt{\cfrac{d \mathbf{X}}{d s}\cdot\left[
\left(\cfrac{d \mathbf{x}}{d \mathbf{X}}\right)^T\cdot \cfrac{d \mathbf{x}}{d \mathbf{X}}\right]
\cdot\cfrac{d \mathbf{X}}{d s} }~ds
\end{align}$$
Note that the right Cauchy–Green deformation tensor is defined as
$$\boldsymbol{C} := \boldsymbol{F}^T\cdot\boldsymbol{F} = \left(\cfrac{d \mathbf{x}}{d \mathbf{X}}\right)^T\cdot \cfrac{d \mathbf{x}}{d \mathbf{X}}$$
Hence,
$$l_x = \int_0^1 \sqrt{ \cfrac{d \mathbf{X}}{d s}\cdot\boldsymbol{C} \cdot\cfrac{d \mathbf{X}}{d s} }~ds$$
which indicates that changes in length are characterized by $\boldsymbol{C}$.

== Finite strain tensors ==
The concept of strain is used to evaluate how much a given displacement differs locally from a rigid body displacement. One of such strains for large deformations is the Lagrangian finite strain tensor, also called the Green-Lagrangian strain tensor or Green–St-Venant strain tensor, defined as

$$\mathbf E=\frac{1}{2}(\mathbf C - \mathbf I)\qquad \text{or} \qquad E_{KL}=\frac{1}{2}\left( \frac{\partial x_j}{\partial X_K}\frac{\partial x_j}{\partial X_L}-\delta_{KL}\right)$$

or as a function of the displacement gradient tensor
$$\mathbf E =\frac{1}{2}\left[ (\nabla_{\mathbf X}\mathbf u)^T + \nabla_{\mathbf X}\mathbf u + (\nabla_{\mathbf X}\mathbf u)^T \cdot\nabla_{\mathbf X}\mathbf u\right]$$
or
$$E_{KL}=\frac{1}{2}\left(\frac{\partial u_K}{\partial X_L}+\frac{\partial u_L}{\partial X_K}+\frac{\partial u_M}{\partial X_K}\frac{\partial u_M}{\partial X_L}\right)$$

The Green-Lagrangian strain tensor is a measure of how much $\mathbf C$ differs from $\mathbf I\,\!$.

The Eulerian finite strain tensor, or Eulerian-Almansi finite strain tensor, referenced to the deformed configuration (i.e. Eulerian description) is defined as

$$\mathbf e=\frac{1}{2}(\mathbf I - \mathbf c)=\frac{1}{2}(\mathbf I - \mathbf B ^{-1})
\qquad \text{or} \qquad
e_{rs} = \frac{1}{2} \left(\delta_{rs} - \frac{\partial X_M}{\partial x_r} \frac{\partial X_M}{\partial x_s}\right)$$

or as a function of the displacement gradients we have
$$e_{ij} = \frac{1}{2} \left(\frac{\partial u_i}{\partial x_j} + \frac{\partial u_j}{\partial x_i} - \frac{\partial u_k}{\partial x_i} \frac{\partial u_k}{\partial x_j}\right)$$

Derivation of the Lagrangian and Eulerian finite strain tensors

A measure of deformation is the difference between the squares of the differential line element $d\mathbf X\,\!$, in the undeformed configuration, and $d\mathbf x\,\!$, in the deformed configuration (Figure 2). Deformation has occurred if the difference is non zero, otherwise a rigid-body displacement has occurred. Thus we have,

$$d\mathbf{x}^2 - d\mathbf{X}^2=d\mathbf x\cdot d\mathbf x-d\mathbf X\cdot d\mathbf X
\qquad \text{or} \qquad
(dx)^2 - (dX)^2=dx_jdx_j-dX_M\,dX_M$$

In the Lagrangian description, using the material coordinates as the frame of reference, the linear transformation between the differential lines is

$$d\mathbf x = \frac {\partial \mathbf x} {\partial \mathbf X}\,d\mathbf X=\mathbf F \,d\mathbf{X} \qquad\text{or} \qquad dx_j=\frac{\partial x_j}{\partial X_M} \,dX_M$$

Then we have,

$$\begin{align}
d\mathbf{x}^2&=d\mathbf x \cdot d\mathbf x \\
&= \mathbf F \cdot d\mathbf X \cdot \mathbf F \cdot d\mathbf X \\
&= d\mathbf X \cdot \mathbf F^T\mathbf F \cdot d\mathbf X \\
&= d\mathbf X\cdot\mathbf C\cdot d\mathbf X
\end{align}
\qquad \text{or} \qquad
\begin{align}
(dx)^2&=dx_j\,dx_j \\
&= \frac{\partial x_j}{\partial X_K}\frac{\partial x_j}{\partial X_L}\,dX_K\,dX_L \\
&= C_{KL}\,dX_K\,dX_L \\
\end{align}$$

where $C_{KL}$ are the components of the right Cauchy–Green deformation tensor, $\mathbf C = \mathbf F^T \mathbf F\,\!$. Then, replacing this equation into the first equation we have,

$$\begin{align}
d\mathbf{x}^2 - d\mathbf{X}^2 &= d\mathbf X\cdot\mathbf C\cdot d\mathbf X-d\mathbf X\cdot d\mathbf X \\
&=d\mathbf X\cdot (\mathbf C - \mathbf I)\cdot d\mathbf X \\
&= d\mathbf X \cdot 2\mathbf E \cdot d\mathbf X \\
\end{align}$$
or
$$\begin{align}
(dx)^2 - (dX)^2 &= \frac{\partial x_j}{\partial X_K}\frac{\partial x_j}{\partial X_L}\,dX_K\,dX_L-dX_M\,dX_M \\
&= \left( \frac{\partial x_j}{\partial X_K}\frac{\partial x_j}{\partial X_L}-\delta_{KL}\right)\,dX_K\,dX_L \\
&=2E_{KL}\,dX_K\,dX_L
\end{align}$$
where $E_{KL}\,\!$, are the components of a second-order tensor called the Green – St-Venant strain tensor or the Lagrangian finite strain tensor,
$$\mathbf E=\frac{1}{2}(\mathbf C - \mathbf I)\qquad \text{or} \qquad E_{KL}=\frac{1}{2}\left( \frac{\partial x_j}{\partial X_K}\frac{\partial x_j}{\partial X_L}-\delta_{KL}\right)$$

In the Eulerian description, using the spatial coordinates as the frame of reference, the linear transformation between the differential lines is
$$d\mathbf{X} = \frac {\partial \mathbf{X}} {\partial \mathbf {x}}d\mathbf{x}=\mathbf F^{-1} \, d\mathbf{x}=\mathbf{H} \,d\mathbf{x} \qquad \text{or} \qquad dX_M=\frac{\partial X_M}{\partial x_n}\, dx_n$$
where $\frac{\partial X_M}{\partial x_n}$ are the components of the spatial deformation gradient tensor, $\mathbf{H}\,\!$. Thus we have

$$\begin{align}
d\mathbf{X}^2 &= d\mathbf X \cdot d\mathbf X \\
&= \mathbf F^{-1} \cdot d\mathbf x \cdot \mathbf F^{-1} \cdot d\mathbf x \\
&= d\mathbf x \cdot \mathbf F^{-T}\mathbf F^{-1} \cdot d\mathbf x \\
&= d\mathbf x\cdot\mathbf c\cdot d\mathbf x
\end{align}
\qquad \text{or} \qquad
\begin{align}
(dX)^2&=dX_M\,dX_M \\
&= \frac{\partial X_M}{\partial x_r}\frac{\partial X_M}{\partial x_s}\,dx_r\,dx_s \\
&= c_{rs}\,dx_r\,dx_s \\
\end{align}$$
where the second order tensor $c_{rs}$ is called Cauchy's deformation tensor, $\mathbf c=\mathbf F^{-T}\mathbf F^{-1}\,\!$. Then we have,

$$\begin{align}
d\mathbf{x}^2 - d\mathbf{X}^2 &= d\mathbf x\cdot d\mathbf x-d\mathbf x\cdot\mathbf c\cdot d\mathbf x \\
&=d\mathbf x\cdot (\mathbf I - \mathbf c)\cdot d\mathbf x \\
&= d\mathbf x \cdot 2\mathbf e \cdot d\mathbf x \\
\end{align}$$
or
$$\begin{align}
(dx)^2 - (dX)^2 &= dx_j\,dx_j-\frac{\partial X_M}{\partial x_r}\frac{\partial X_M}{\partial x_s}\,dx_r\,dx_s \\
&= \left(\delta_{rs} - \frac{\partial X_M}{\partial x_r}\frac{\partial X_M}{\partial x_s} \right)\,dx_r\,dx_s \\
&=2e_{rs}\,dx_r\,dx_s
\end{align}$$

where $e_{rs}\,\!$, are the components of a second-order tensor called the Eulerian-Almansi finite strain tensor,
$$\mathbf e=\frac{1}{2}(\mathbf I - \mathbf c)
\qquad \text{or} \qquad
e_{rs}=\frac{1}{2}\left(\delta_{rs} - \frac{\partial X_M}{\partial x_r}\frac{\partial X_M}{\partial x_s} \right)$$

Both the Lagrangian and Eulerian finite strain tensors can be conveniently expressed in terms of the displacement gradient tensor. For the Lagrangian strain tensor, first we differentiate the displacement vector $\mathbf u(\mathbf X, t)$ with respect to the material coordinates $X_M$ to obtain the material displacement gradient tensor, $\nabla_{\mathbf X}\mathbf u$

$$\begin{align}
\mathbf u(\mathbf X,t) &= \mathbf x(\mathbf X,t) - \mathbf X \\
\nabla_{\mathbf X}\mathbf u &= \mathbf F - \mathbf I \\
\mathbf F &= \nabla_{\mathbf X}\mathbf u + \mathbf I \\
\end{align}
\qquad \text{or} \qquad
\begin{align}
u_i& = x_i-\delta_{iJ}X_J \\
\delta_{iJ}U_J &= x_i-\delta_{iJ}X_J \\
x_i&=\delta_{iJ}\left(U_J+X_J\right) \\
\frac{\partial x_i}{\partial X_K}&=\delta_{iJ}\left(\frac{\partial U_J}{\partial X_K}+\delta_{JK}\right) \\
&=\frac{\partial u_i}{\partial X_K}+\delta_{iK}
\end{align}$$

Replacing this equation into the expression for the Lagrangian finite strain tensor we have
$$\begin{align}
\mathbf E &= \frac{1}{2}\left(\mathbf F^T\mathbf F-\mathbf I\right) \\
&=\frac{1}{2}\left[ \left\{ (\nabla_{\mathbf X}\mathbf u)^T+\mathbf I\right\}\left( \nabla_{\mathbf X}\mathbf u+\mathbf I\right)-\mathbf I\right] \\
&=\frac{1}{2}\left[ (\nabla_{\mathbf X}\mathbf u)^T + \nabla_{\mathbf X}\mathbf u + (\nabla_{\mathbf X}\mathbf u)^T \cdot\nabla_{\mathbf X}\mathbf u\right] \\
\end{align}$$
or
$$\begin{align}
E_{KL}&=\frac{1}{2}\left( \frac{\partial x_j}{\partial X_K} \frac{\partial x_j}{\partial X_L} - \delta_{KL}\right) \\
&=\frac{1}{2} \left[\delta_{jM}\left(\frac{\partial U_M}{\partial X_K}+\delta_{MK}\right)\delta_{jN}\left(\frac{\partial U_N}{\partial X_L}+\delta_{NL}\right)-\delta_{KL}\right] \\
&=\frac{1}{2}\left[\delta_{MN}\left(\frac{\partial U_M}{\partial X_K}+\delta_{MK}\right)\left(\frac{\partial U_N}{\partial X_L}+\delta_{NL}\right)-\delta_{KL}\right] \\
&=\frac{1}{2}\left[\left(\frac{\partial U_M}{\partial X_K}+\delta_{MK}\right)\left(\frac{\partial U_M}{\partial X_L}+\delta_{ML}\right)-\delta_{KL}\right] \\
&=\frac{1}{2}\left(\frac{\partial U_K}{\partial X_L} +\frac{\partial U_L}{\partial X_K} +\frac{\partial U_M}{\partial X_K} \frac{\partial U_M}{\partial X_L}\right)
\end{align}$$

Similarly, the Eulerian-Almansi finite strain tensor can be expressed as

$$e_{ij} = \frac{1}{2} \left(\frac{\partial u_i}{\partial x_j} +\frac{\partial u_j}{\partial x_i} - \frac{\partial u_k}{\partial x_i} \frac{\partial u_k}{\partial x_j}\right)$$

=== Seth–Hill family of generalized strain tensors ===
B. R. Seth from the Indian Institute of Technology Kharagpur was the first to show that the Green and Almansi strain tensors are special cases of a more general strain measure. The idea was further expanded upon by Rodney Hill in 1968. The Seth–Hill family of strain measures (also called Doyle-Ericksen tensors) can be expressed as

$$\mathbf E_{(m)}=\frac{1}{2m}(\mathbf U^{2m}- \mathbf I) = \frac{1}{2m}\left[\mathbf{C}^{m} - \mathbf{I}\right]$$

For different values of $m$ we have:

- Green-Lagrangian strain tensor
  $$\mathbf E_{(1)} = \frac{1}{2} (\mathbf U^{2}- \mathbf I) = \frac{1}{2} (\mathbf{C}-\mathbf{I})$$
- Biot strain tensor
  $$\mathbf E_{(1/2)} = (\mathbf U - \mathbf I) = \mathbf{C}^{1/2}-\mathbf{I}$$
- Logarithmic strain, Natural strain, True strain, or Hencky strain
  $$\mathbf E_{(0)} = \ln \mathbf U = \frac{1}{2}\,\ln\mathbf{C}$$
- Almansi strain
  $$\mathbf{E}_{(-1)} = \frac{1}{2}\left[\mathbf{I}-\mathbf{U}^{-2}\right]$$

The second-order approximation of these tensors is
$$\mathbf{E}_{(m)} = \boldsymbol{\varepsilon} + {\tfrac 1 2}(\nabla\mathbf{u})^T\cdot\nabla\mathbf{u} - (1 - m) \boldsymbol{\varepsilon}^T\cdot\boldsymbol{\varepsilon}$$
where $\boldsymbol{\varepsilon}$ is the infinitesimal strain tensor.

Many other different definitions of tensors $\mathbf{E}$ are admissible, provided that they all satisfy the conditions that:

- $\mathbf{E}$ vanishes for all rigid-body motions
- the dependence of $\mathbf{E}$ on the displacement gradient tensor $\nabla\mathbf{u}$ is continuous, continuously differentiable and monotonic
- it is also desired that $\mathbf{E}$ reduces to the infinitesimal strain tensor $\boldsymbol{\varepsilon}$ as the norm $|\nabla\mathbf{u}| \to 0$

An example is the set of tensors
$$\mathbf{E}^{(n)} = \left({\mathbf U}^n - {\mathbf U}^{-n}\right)/2n$$
which do not belong to the Seth–Hill class, but have the same 2nd-order approximation as the Seth–Hill measures at $m=0$ for any value of $n$.

=== Physical interpretation of the finite strain tensor ===
The diagonal components $E_{KL}$ of the Lagrangian finite strain tensor are related to the normal strain, e.g.

$$E_{11}=e_{(\mathbf I_1)}+\frac{1}{2} e_{(\mathbf I_1)}^2$$

where $e_{(\mathbf I_1)}$ is the normal strain or engineering strain in the direction $\mathbf I_1\,\!$.

The off-diagonal components $E_{KL}$ of the Lagrangian finite strain tensor are related to shear strain, e.g.

$$E_{12}=\frac{1}{2}\sqrt{2E_{11}+1}\sqrt{2E_{22}+1}\sin\phi_{12}$$

where $\phi_{12}$ is the change in the angle between two line elements that were originally perpendicular with directions $\mathbf I_1$ and $\mathbf I_2\,\!$, respectively.

Under certain circumstances, i.e. small displacements and small displacement rates, the components of the Lagrangian finite strain tensor may be approximated by the components of the infinitesimal strain tensor

Derivation of the physical interpretation of the Lagrangian and Eulerian finite strain tensors

The stretch ratio for the differential element $d\mathbf X = dX\mathbf N$ (Figure) in the direction of the unit vector $\mathbf N$ at the material point $P\,\!$, in the undeformed configuration, is defined as

$$\Lambda_{(\mathbf N)}=\frac{dx}{dX}$$

where $dx$ is the deformed magnitude of the differential element $d\mathbf X\,\!$.

Similarly, the stretch ratio for the differential element $d\mathbf x = dx\mathbf n$ (Figure), in the direction of the unit vector $\mathbf n$ at the material point $p\,\!$, in the deformed configuration, is defined as
$$\frac{1}{\Lambda_{(\mathbf n)}} = \frac{dX}{dx}$$

The square of the stretch ratio is defined as
$$\Lambda_{(\mathbf N)}^2=\left (\frac{dx}{dX}\right )^2$$

Knowing that
$$(dx)^2=C_{KL}dX_KdX_L$$
we have
$$\Lambda_{(\mathbf N)}^2 = C_{KL} N_K N_L$$
where $N_K$ and $N_L$ are unit vectors.

The normal strain or engineering strain $e_{\mathbf N}$ in any direction $\mathbf N$ can be expressed as a function of the stretch ratio,

$$e_{(\mathbf N)}=\frac{dx-dX}{dX}=\Lambda_{(\mathbf N)}-1$$

Thus, the normal strain in the direction $\mathbf I_1$ at the material point $P$ may be expressed in terms of the stretch ratio as

$$\begin{align}
e_{(\mathbf I_1)}=\frac{dx_1-dX_1}{dX_1}&=\Lambda_{(\mathbf I_1)}-1\\
&=\sqrt {C_{11}} -1=\sqrt{\delta_{11}+2E_{11}}-1\\
&=\sqrt{1+2E_{11}}-1
\end{align}$$

solving for $E_{11}$ we have

$$\begin{align}
2E_{11}&= \frac{(dx_1)^2 - (dX_1)^2}{(dX_1)^2} \\
E_{11}&= \left(\frac{dx_1-dX_1}{dX_1}\right)+ \frac {1}{2} \left(\frac{dx_1-dX_1}{dX_1}\right)^2 \\
&=e_{(\mathbf I_1)}+\frac{1}{2}e_{(\mathbf I_1)}^2
\end{align}$$

The shear strain, or change in angle between two line elements $d\mathbf X_1$ and $d\mathbf X_2$ initially perpendicular, and oriented in the principal directions $\mathbf I_1$ and $\mathbf I_2\,\!$, respectively, can also be expressed as a function of the stretch ratio. From the dot product between the deformed lines $d\mathbf x_1$ and $d\mathbf x_2$ we have

$$\begin{align}
d\mathbf x_1 \cdot d\mathbf x_2 &=dx_1 dx_2 \cos\theta_{12} \\
\mathbf F \cdot d\mathbf X_1\cdot \mathbf F\cdot d\mathbf X_2&= \sqrt {d\mathbf X_1 \cdot \mathbf F^T\cdot\mathbf F \cdot d\mathbf X_1}\cdot \sqrt {d\mathbf X_2 \cdot \mathbf F^T\cdot\mathbf F \cdot d\mathbf X_2} \cos\theta_{12} \\
\frac{d\mathbf X_1\cdot \mathbf F^T\cdot\mathbf F\cdot d\mathbf X_2}{dX_1 dX_2} &=\frac{\sqrt {d\mathbf X_1 \cdot \mathbf F^T\cdot\mathbf F \cdot d\mathbf X_1}\cdot \sqrt {d\mathbf X_2 \cdot \mathbf F^T\cdot\mathbf F \cdot d\mathbf X_2}}{dX_1 dX_2} \cos\theta_{12}\\
\mathbf I_1 \cdot \mathbf C \cdot \mathbf I_2&= \Lambda_{\mathbf I_1}\Lambda_{\mathbf I_2}\cos\theta_{12}
\end{align}$$

where $\theta_{12}$ is the angle between the lines $d\mathbf x_1$ and $d\mathbf x_2$ in the deformed configuration. Defining $\phi_{12}$ as the shear strain or reduction in the angle between two line elements that were originally perpendicular, we have

$$\phi_{12}=\frac{\pi}{2}-\theta_{12}$$
thus,
$$\cos\theta_{12}=\sin\phi_{12}$$
then
$$\mathbf I_1 \cdot \mathbf C \cdot \mathbf I_2= \Lambda_{\mathbf I_1} \Lambda_{\mathbf I_2}\sin\phi_{12}$$

or

$$\begin{align}
C_{12}&=\sqrt{C_{11}}\sqrt{C_{22}}\sin\phi_{12}\\
2E_{12}+\delta_{12}&=\sqrt{2E_{11}+1}\sqrt{2E_{22}+1}\sin\phi_{12}\\
E_{12}&=\frac{1}{2}\sqrt{2E_{11}+1}\sqrt{2E_{22}+1}\sin\phi_{12}
\end{align}$$

== Compatibility conditions ==
The problem of compatibility in continuum mechanics involves the determination of allowable single-valued continuous fields on bodies. These allowable conditions leave the body without unphysical gaps or overlaps after a deformation. Most such conditions apply to simply-connected bodies. Additional conditions are required for the internal boundaries of multiply connected bodies.

=== Compatibility of the deformation gradient ===
The necessary and sufficient conditions for the existence of a compatible $\boldsymbol{F}$ field over a simply connected body are
$$\boldsymbol{\nabla}\times\boldsymbol{F} = \boldsymbol{0}$$

=== Compatibility of the right Cauchy–Green deformation tensor ===
The necessary and sufficient conditions for the existence of a compatible $\boldsymbol{C}$ field over a simply connected body are
$$R^\gamma_{\alpha\beta\rho} :=
\frac{\partial }{\partial X^\rho}[\,_{(X)}\Gamma^\gamma_{\alpha\beta}] -
\frac{\partial }{\partial X^\beta}[\,_{(X)}\Gamma^\gamma_{\alpha\rho}] +
\,_{(X)}\Gamma^\gamma_{\mu\rho}\,_{(X)}\Gamma^\mu_{\alpha\beta} -
\,_{(X)}\Gamma^\gamma_{\mu\beta}\,_{(X)}\Gamma^\mu_{\alpha\rho} = 0$$
We can show these are the mixed components of the Riemann–Christoffel curvature tensor. Therefore, the necessary conditions for $\boldsymbol{C}$-compatibility are that the Riemann–Christoffel curvature of the deformation is zero.

=== Compatibility of the left Cauchy–Green deformation tensor ===
General sufficiency conditions for the left Cauchy–Green deformation tensor in three dimensions has been discussed in several works.

== See also ==
- Infinitesimal strain
- Compatibility (mechanics)
- Curvilinear coordinates
- Piola–Kirchhoff stress tensor, the stress tensor for finite deformations.
- Stress measures
- Strain partitioning
