= List of rheologists =

This is a list of notable rheologists.

== Rheologists ==
- Eugene C. Bingham
- Robert Byron Bird
- Mosto Bousmina
- Percy Williams Bridgman
- Pierre Carreau
- Alfred L. Copley
- Maurice Couette
- Armand de Waele
- Morton Denn
- Jerald Ericksen
- Denis Evans
- Henry Eyring
- Gerald Fuller
- Eugene Guth
- John Hinch
- Isydore Hlynka
- Jacob Israelachvili
- L. Gary Leal
- Frank Matthews Leslie
- Arthur S. Lodge
- Christopher Macosko
- Raghunath Anant Mashelkar
- Josef Meixner
- Baltasar Mena Iniesta
- Arthur B. Metzner
- Melvin Mooney
- James G. Oldroyd
- Egon Orowan
- Anton Peterlin
- Jeshwanth Rameshwaram
- Markus Reiner
- Jack Richardson
- Ronald Rivlin
- G. W. Scott Blair
- Zinovii Shulman
- Clifford Truesdell
- Kenneth Walters
- Manfred Wagner
- Dieter Weichert
- Karl Weissenberg
- James L. White
- Clarence Zener

== See also ==
- Lists of people by occupation
