= Horst Henning Winter =

German American chemical engineer

- Born: September 9, 1941 (age 85); Stuttgart, Germany
- Relatives: Ernst R. G. Eckert (father-in-law)
- Awards: Bingham Medal

Academic background
- Education: Dipl-Ing., Polymer Engineering; M.S., Chemical Engineering; Ph.D., Polymer Rheology
- Alma mater: University of Stuttgart; Stanford University

Horst Henning Winter is a German American chemical engineer, educator and researcher. He is a distinguished professor at the University of Massachusetts Amherst, and was the executive editor of Rheologica Acta from 1989 to 2016, where he has served as honorary editor since 2017.

Winter's research focuses on the measurement and modelling of soft matter rheology. He has given special attention to gelation, glass transition and flow-induced structure in polymers. Winter and his group developed highly-specific experimental methods, as well as analysis tools and visualization methods to support this research.

In 1996, Winter was awarded the Bingham Medal in recognition of his contributions to experimental rheology, as well as rheometry of gels and polymer melts. He was also chosen for the National Science Foundation Creativity Award in 1997 and the Alexander von Humboldt Senior Scientist Award in 1999, during which he was a visiting professor at the Max Planck Institute of Colloids and Interfaces in Potsdam. Winter is furthermore the co-founder of IRIS Development and founder of 2D Matter. Winter lives with his wife Karin. They have four children.

== Early life and education ==
Winter was born in Stuttgart, Germany in 1941. He obtained a Dipl-Ing. in Mechanical Engineering at the University of Stuttgart in 1967. He then received an M.S. from Stanford University in Chemical Engineering in 1968. He returned to University of Stuttgart where he completed his Ph.D. in 1973 in Polymer Rheology, an interest he continued pursuing immediately after graduation through work as a DFG (German Research Foundation) fellow at the Rheology Research Center at the University of Wisconsin-Madison. In 1976, this led to a habilitation thesis on viscous dissipation in polymer flow.

== Career ==
Winter began his teaching career as Privatdozent for Rheology at University of Stuttgart in 1976. He transferred as associate professor to the University of Massachusetts Amherst in 1979, becoming full professor in 1984, and was named distinguished professor in 1994. At the same time, he also became the director of the Laboratory for Experimental Rheology.

He was the executive editor of Rheologica Acta from 1989 to 2016, served on the editorial board of Journal of Rheology from 1989 to 2005, and of Journal of Non-Newton Fluid Mechanics from 1989 to 2018. From 2009 to 2012, he served as director of the Fluid Dynamics Program at the National Science Foundation (NSF), after which he returned to UMass.

In 2007, Winter founded IRIS Development LLC, a software service company in support of experimental rheology and rheology education. The company holds the 'Amherst Rheology Courses' and licenses IRIS RheoHub, a software tool used for research and teaching by academic researchers, and by industrial decision makers so that they can utilize rheology efficiently. A main feature of the software is the visualization of rheology results by a direct overlay of experimental data and predictions from rheology theory.

Winter founded 2D Matter LLC in 2018. It promotes the engineering of two-dimensional materials such as clay, graphene, zeolite, as generated by the exfoliation of precursors with layered structure.

== Research and work ==
In a series of papers, Winter and his co-worker Fancois Chambon characterized the time-evolving rheology of polymers during gelation. They discovered that the gel point is marked by power-law relaxation over a wide range of frequencies/time-scales. Depending on the type of gel, the scaling exponent may adopt a value between -1 and 0. This behavior makes it easy to uniquely identify the gel point during both chemical and physical gelation processes. The experimental findings initiated active development of theories for the rheology of gels in the physics community. The findings also had technological impact, supporting the commercial development of gels as adhesives, sealants, toners, and biological materials. The original paper continues to be the most cited publication ever in the Journal of Rheology.

Winter and his co-worker Michael Baumgärtel wrote the parsimonious model, the first robust code to convert dynamic mechanical data into their relaxation time spectrum and, together with Alois Schausberger, they showed that linear, flexible polymers of uniform chain length relax in a self-similar relaxation time spectrum now known as the BSW spectrum. The BSW relation provides a convenient starting condition for exploring polymer systems of more diverse molecular architecture. For generating biaxial extension in small samples, Winter invented the technique of lubricated squeeze flow and studied it jointly with Christopher Macosko. This simple technique was the first one to provide reliable step-strain biaxial extension data which is important for accurate modeling of polymer processing operations such as film blowing and blow molding.

Winter, along with Miriam Siebenbürger and Matthias Ballauff, discovered rheological scaling laws that govern the glass transition. This discovery led to the development of a new criterion for distinguishing gels from soft glass. With Alessio Zaccone, they also developed rheological scaling laws for colloidal gels, which take into account the power-law growth kinetics in the colloidal self-assembly.

Winter also contributed to the numerical modeling of polymer processing operations and his 1977 paper on viscous dissipation in flowing polymer systems is widely considered a classic in the area.

Winter and his group have also worked on the efficient decomposition of solid particles into thin leaves. They have produced organo-clay sheets from clay, graphene from graphite, and 2-D zeolites from zeolite monolith particles. Their novel process for graphite-to-graphene exfoliation has produced pristine graphene at substantially increased yield.

== Awards and honors ==
- 1973-4 - Fellow of the Deutsche Forschungsgemeinschaft (DFG)
- 1991 - Outstanding Senior Faculty Award, College of Engineering, U. Massachusetts
- 1994 - Distinguished University Professor, title awarded by the U. Massachusetts Board of Trustees
- 1996 - Bingham Medal, awarded by the American Society of Rheology
- 1997 - National Science Foundation Creativity Award
- 1999 - Alexander von Humboldt Senior Scientist Award
- 2004 - Samuel F. Conti Faculty Fellow Award
- 2013 - Recognition by The Soc. Rheology: “First Thousand-Citation Article” in a rheology journal
- 2015 - Fellow, Society of Rheology

== Publications ==
- Baumgärtel, M., & Winter, H. H. (1989). Determination of discrete relaxation and retardation time spectra from dynamic mechanical data. Rheologica Acta, 28(6), 511–519.
- Baumgärtel, M., Schausberger, A., & Winter, H. H. (1990). The relaxation of polymers with linear flexible chains of uniform length. Rheologica Acta, 29(5), 400–408.
- Chambon, F., & Winter, H. (1985). Stopping of crosslinking reaction in a PDMS polymer at the gel point. Polymer Bulletin, 13(6).
- Chambon, F., & Winter, H. H. (1987). Linear Viscoelasticity at the Gel Point of a Crosslinking PDMS with Imbalanced Stoichiometry. Journal of Rheology, 31(8), 683–697.
- Chatraei, S., Macosko, C. W., & Winter, H. H. (1981). Lubricated Squeezing Flow: A New Biaxial Extensional Rheometer. Journal of Rheology, 25(4), 433–443.
- Nijenhuis, K. T., & Winter, H. H. (1989). Mechanical properties at the gel point of a crystallizing poly(vinyl chloride) solution. Macromolecules, 22(1), 411–414.
- Sabnis, S., Tanna, V. A., Li, C., Zhu, J., Vattipalli, V., Nonnenmann, S. S., Sheng, G., Lai, Z., Winter, H. H., & Fan, W. (2017) Exfoliation of two-dimensional zeolites in liquid polybutadienes. Chemical Communications, 53, 7011-7014
- Scanlan, J. C., & Winter, H. H. (1991). Composition dependence of the viscoelasticity of end-linked poly(dimethylsiloxane) at the gel point. Macromolecules, 24(1), 47–54.
- Winter, H. H., & Chambon, F. (1986). Analysis of Linear Viscoelasticity of a Crosslinking Polymer at the Gel Point. Journal of Rheology, 30(2), 367–382.
- Winter, H. H. (1987). Can the gel point of a cross-linking polymer be detected by theG? -G? crossover?. Polymer Engineering and Science, 27(22), 1698–1702.
- Winter, H. H., & Mours, M. (1997) Rheology of Polymers Near Liquid-Solid Transitions. Advances in Polymer Science, 134,165–234.
- Winter, H. H., & Mours, M (2006) The cyber infrastructure initiative for rheology. Rheologica Acta, 45, 331-338
