= Morton Denn =

American rheologist

Morton M. Denn
- Born: Morton Mace Denn; July 7, 1939 (age 87); Paterson, New Jersey, USA
- Occupations: Rheologist, professor
- Years active: 1965-present
- Title: Albert Einstein Professor Emeritus of Science and Engineering
- Spouse: Vivienne Roumani
- Children: 3, including Matt Denn
- Awards: Fulbright Lectureship, Guggenheim Fellowship, Bingham Medal

Academic background
- Education: Princeton University (BScE), University of Minnesota (PhD)
- Thesis: "The Optimization by Complex Processes" (1964)
- Doctoral advisor: Rutherford Aris
- Other advisors: William R. Schowalter, Arthur B. Metzner

Academic work
- Discipline: Rheology, chemical engineering
- Institutions: University of Delaware, Berkeley, City College of New York
- Notable students: Benny D. Freeman, Rakesh Jain, Yogesh M. Joshi, Glenn Lipscomb

Morton Mace Denn (born July 7, 1939) is a rheologist, chemical engineer, and the Albert Einstein Professor Emeritus of Science and Engineering at the City College of New York. He is a member of the National Academy of Engineering, a Fellow of the American Academy of Arts and Sciences, and winner of a Fulbright Lectureship award, Guggenheim Fellowship, and the Bingham Medal. He previously taught at the University of Delaware and the University of California, Berkeley and was the director of the Benjamin Levich Institute for Physicochemical Hydrodynamics from 2001 to 2015. He was also a program leader at Lawrence Berkeley National Laboratory for 16 years.

== Early life ==
Denn was born on July 7, 1939, in Paterson, New Jersey to Herbert, a drugstore owner, and Esther Denn. He has one sister, Dorothy. During his childhood, Denn was an active member of the Junior Congregation of Temple Emanuel of North Jersey in Paterson was part of his synagogue's Boy Scout troop, and in 1957 served as the North Jersey Regional President of the Aleph Zadik Aleph youth organization. He graduated from Eastside High School, where he was inducted into the National Honor Society, in 1957. He worked as a laboratory technician for the Linen Thread Company developing foamed plastic boat bumpers the summer before college.

While at Princeton University, he was president of Hillel and a member of the Dial Lodge, Triangle Club, and band. He wrote a senior thesis under William R. Schowalter on normal stress measurements and worked at the Dupont Engineering Research Laboratory during the summers of 1960 and 1961. He graduated magna cum laude with a BScE in chemical engineering in 1961. He pursued his PhD in chemical engineering at the University of Minnesota between 1961 and 1964 and wrote his dissertation, "The Optimization by Complex Processes," under the supervision of Rutherford Aris. After finishing his degree, he spent one year as a postdoctoral fellow in the University of Delaware's Chemical Engineering department, studying Non-Newtonian fluid mechanics with Arthur B. Metzner.

== Career ==
Denn joined the faculty at the University of Delaware in 1965 as an assistant professor of computer science; only a quarter of his academic appointment at this time was in chemical engineering. He became an associate professor of chemical engineering in 1968, a full professor in 1971, and the Allan P. Colburn Professor in 1977. He moved to the University of California, Berkeley, as professor of chemical engineering in 1981 and served as the department chair from 1991 to 1994. He simultaneously held an appointment at the Lawrence Berkeley National Laboratory, where he was the program leader and founder of the Polymers and Composites Research Program in the Center for Advanced Materials from 1983 to 1999. He also headed the Materials Chemistry group in the Materials Science Division from 1995 to 1998.

Denn joined the faculty of City College of New York in 1999 as CUNY Distinguished Professor of Chemical Engineering. He also held an appointment in the physics department. In 2001, he became the Albert Einstein Professor of Science and Engineering and was appointed the third director of the Benjamin Levich Institute for Physicochemical Hydrodynamics, a role he held until 2015. He retired in 2014. Students who worked in his lab include Benny D. Freeman, Rakesh Jain, and Glenn Lipscomb.

During his career, Denn was a visiting professor at the Massachusetts Institute of Technology (1978-1985); Technion – Israel Institute of Technology (1979-1980); California Institute of Technology (1980); University of Melbourne (1985); Hebrew University of Jerusalem (1998-1999, 2009–2010); Katholieke Universiteit Leuven (2011, 2014); and University of Amsterdam (2012-2015). He worked as the sole editor of AIChE Journal between 1985 and 1991 and as the editor for the Journal of Rheology from 1995 to 2005. He also worked on the editorial boards for the Journal of Non-Newtonian Fluid Mechanics (1976-2019), Advances in Chemical Engineering (1984–85, 1993–2003), and Rheologica Acta (1995-2005) and as a consulting editor for AIChE Journal from 1991 to 1995.

== Personal life ==
He married Marilyn Goldfarb in Teaneck, New Jersey on June 28, 1962 and had three children: Matt, Susannah, and Rebekah. By 1996, he had married historian Vivienne Roumani.

== Selected publications ==
=== Articles ===
- 1976: "Instabilities in polymer processing." American Institute of Chemical Engineering Journal, 22(2): 209–236. doi:10.1002/aic.690220202
- 1976: "Chemical Process Control." With A.S. Foss. American Institute of Chemical Engineers Conference Proceedings (159): 232.
- 1987: "Wall slip and extrudate distortion in linear low-density polyethylene." Journal of Rheology, 31(8): 815–834. With D.S. Kalika. doi:10.1122/1.549942
- 2001: "Extrusion instabilities and wall slip." Annual Review of Fluid Mechanics, 33(1): 265–287. With C.J.S. Petrie. doi:10.1146/annurev.fluid.33.1.265
- 2013: "Discontinuous shear thickening of frictional hard-sphere suspensions." Physical Review Letters, 111(21): 218301. With R. Seto, R. Mari, and J.F. Morris. doi:10.1103/PhysRevLett.111.218301
- 2017: "Yield stress materials in soft condensed matter." Reviews of Modern Physics, 89(3): 035005. With D. Bonn, L. Berthier, T. Diboux, and S. Manneville. doi:10.1103/RevModPhys.89.035005

=== Books ===
- 1969: Optimization by Variational Methods. McGraw-Hill. ISBN 978-0070163959. 1978 reprint by Krieger Publishing. ISBN 978-0882755953.
- 1972: Introduction to Chemical Engineering Analysis with T.W.F. Russell. Wiley. ISBN 978-0471745457.
- 1975: Stability of Reaction and Transport Processes. Prentice-Hall. ISBN 978-0138402648.
- 1980: Process Fluid Mechanics. Prentice-Hall. ISBN 978-0137231713.
- 1986: Process Modeling. Longman/Wiley. ISBN 978-0273087045
- 2008: Polymer Melt Processing: Foundations in Fluid Mechanics and Heat Transfer. Cambridge University Press. ISBN 978-0521899697.
- 2011: Chemical Engineering: An Introduction. Cambridge University Press. ISBN 978-1107669376.

=== Book chapters ===
- 1979: "Modeling for Process Control" in Advances in Control and Dynamic Systems, ed. C.T. Leondes. Academic Press. Pages 148–192. ISBN 978-0120127214.
- 1983: "Fibre Spinning" in Computational Analysis of Polymer Processing, eds. J.R.A. Pearson and S.M. Richardson. Applied Science Publishers Ltd. Pages 179–216. doi:10.1007/978-94-009-6634-5.
- 1986: Coal Gasification Reactors with R. Shinnar in Chemical Reaction and Reactor Engineering, eds. J.J. Carberry and A. Varna. Marcel Dekker. Pages 516–561. ISBN 978-1000103335.
- 1998: "Processing, Modeling." Encyclopedia of Polymer Science and Engineering, Volume 13, ed. J.I. Kroschwitz. Wiley. Page 425. Revised version in third edition, 2004, volume 11, page 263.
- 1991: "The Identity of Our Profession." In Perspectives in Chemical Engineering: Research and Education (Advances in Chemical Engineering, Volume 16, ed. C.K. Colton. Academic Press. Page 565.

== Honors and awards ==
Year	Award/honor	Awarding body	Notes	Ref
1971	Guggenheim Fellowship	John Simon Guggenheim Memorial Foundation		
1977	Andreas Acrivos Award for Professional Progress in Chemical Engineering	American Institute of Chemical Engineers		
1979	Fulbright Lectureship	Bureau of Educational and Cultural Affairs	Project title: "Process dynamics and control and in polymer processing"	
1980	Reilley Lectureship	University of Notre Dame		
1984	William H. Walker Award for Excellence in Contributions to Chemical Engineering Literature	American Institute of Chemical Engineers		
1986	Membership	National Academy of Engineering		
1986	Bingham Medal	Society of Rheology	For "the use of fundamental concepts in rheology and fluid mechanics for the understanding of practical processing behavior"	
1993	Chemstations Lectureship Division Award	American Society for Engineering Education		
1998	Warren K. Lewis Award for Chemical Engineering Education	American Institute of Chemical Engineers		
1999	Institute Lecturer Award	American Institute of Chemical Engineers		
2001	Membership	American Academy of Arts and Sciences		
2001	Honorary D.Sc.	University of Minnesota		
2005	Distinguished Service Award	Society of Rheology		
2008	Founders Award for Outstanding Contributions to the Field of Chemical Engineering	American Institute of Chemical Engineers		
2014	Lifetime Achievement Award in Chemical Engineering	American Society for Engineering Education		
2015	Fellow	Society of Rheology		
2015	Publication Award	Society of Rheology	With R. Mari, R. Seto, and J.F. Morris (doi:10.1122/1.4890747)	
2020	Publication Award	Society of Rheology	With A. Singh, R. Mari, and J.F. Morris (doi:10.1122/1.4999237)	
