= Rouse (surname) =

Rouse is an English-language surname. Notable people with this surname include the following:

- luke rouse, me
- Alan Rouse (1951–1986), British climber
- Alfred Rouse (1894–1931), British convicted murderer
- Andy Rouse, English racing driver
- Bob Rouse, Canadian ice hockey player
- Cecilia Rouse, American economist
- Cole Rouse, American professional racing driver
- Charlie Rouse, American jazz saxophonist
- Christopher Rouse (composer), American composer
- Christopher Rouse (film editor), Academy Award-winning film editor
- Curtis Rouse, American football player
- E. Clive Rouse (1901–1997), English archaeologist
- Fred Rouse (footballer), English association football player
- Fred Rouse (gridiron football), American football player
- Fred Rouse, lynching victim
- Hunter Rouse, hydraulician
- Irving Rouse, American academic
- James W. Rouse, American activist and philanthropist
- Jeff Rouse (swimmer), American swimmer
- Josh Rouse, American singer-songwriter
- Mikel Rouse, American composer
- Owen Thomas Rouse (1843–1919), American jurist
- Pamela Edwards Rouse, American clubwoman, jewelry designer, and businesswoman
- Pete Rouse, American political advisor
- Prince E. Rouse, physicist of Rouse theory fame
- Richard Rouse III, American game designer and author
- Rob Rouse, English comedian and actor
- Robbie Rouse, American football player
- Russell Rouse, Academy Award-winning American screenwriter
- Scott Rouse, D&D Brand Manager at Wizards of the Coast
- Simon Rouse, English actor
- Walter Rouse (born 2001), American football player
- W. H. D. Rouse, English classical scholar and teacher
- W. W. Rouse Ball, English mathematician
- Willard Rouse, American real estate developer
- Aaron Rouse, American football player and politician

== See also ==
- Rowse
