= Lynn M. Walker =

American chemical engineer

Lynn Walker
- Education: University of Delaware; University of New Hampshire
- Scientific career
- Workplaces: Katholieke Universiteit Leuven; Carnegie Mellon University; University of Leeds
- Thesis: Rheology and rheo-optics of liquid crystal polymers under flow (1995)
- Doctoral students: Lilo Pozzo

Lynn Walker is a professor at the Department of Chemical Engineering and Materials Science, University of Minnesota. Her research considers the rheology of complex fluids and how nanostructure impacts the behavior of complex systems. She is a Fellow of the American Institute of Chemical Engineers, the Society of Rheology, and the American Physical Society.

== Early life and education ==
In 1990, Walker obtained her B.Sc. degree in chemical engineering at the University of New Hampshire. She then obtained her Ph.D. from the University of Delaware in 1995, under the supervision of Norman J. Wagner. She did her postdoctoral research at Katholieke Universiteit Leuven, where she continued to investigate the rheology and rheo-optics of liquid crystalline polymers.

== Research and career ==
In 1997, Walker joined the Department of Chemical Engineering at Carnegie Mellon University. Her research efforts look to develop rheological characterization and the development of macromolecular analytical techniques. Her early work characterized non-Newtonian fluids. She has since demonstrated that inkjet printing can be used for biomaterials and solution shearing can be used to control the order of block copolymers. She developed a microtensiometer platform that made it possible to study the dynamics of physical processes at oil-water interfaces.

Walker was a visiting professor at Polymer IRC, University of Leeds during her sabbatical in 2007. Within Carnegie Mellon University, Walker also has courtesy appointments in the Department of Chemistry and the Department of Materials Science & Engineering.

In 2023 September, Walker left CMU, where she worked 26 years, and joined University of Minnesota.

== Awards and honors ==
- 2015 American Institute of Chemical Engineers Mentorship Excellence Award
- 2016 Barbara Lazarus Award for Graduate Student and Junior Faculty Mentoring
- 2017 Elected Fellow of the Society of Rheology
- 2022 Fellow of the American Physical Society

== Selected publications ==
- Lynn M Walker (November 2001). "Rheology and structure of worm-like micelles". Current Opinion in Colloid & Interface Science. 6 (5–6): 451–456. doi:10.1016/s1359-0294(01)00116-9. ISSN 1359-0294. Wikidata Q61860144.
- Wingki Lee; Lynn M. Walker; Shelley L. Anna (March 2009). "Role of geometry and fluid properties in droplet and thread formation processes in planar flow focusing". Physics of Fluids. 21 (3): 032103. doi:10.1063/1.3081407. ISSN 1070-6631. Zbl 1183.76300. Wikidata Q61859914.
- Yenny Christanti; Lynn M. Walker (September 2001). "Surface tension driven jet break up of strain-hardening polymer solutions". Journal of Non-Newtonian Fluid Mechanics. 100 (1–3): 9–26. doi:10.1016/s0377-0257(01)00135-5. ISSN 0377-0257. Wikidata Q61860165.
