= Gareth H. McKinley =

Gareth McKinley FRS
- Born: Gareth Huw McKinley; Hertford
- Education: University of Cambridge (BA, MEng); Massachusetts Institute of Technology (PhD)
- Awards: Bingham Medal (2013); US National Academy of Engineering (2019); Fellow of the Royal Society (2019)
- Scientific career
- Fields: Rheology; Non-Newtonian Fluid Mechanics; Superhydrophobic Surfaces
- Workplaces: Massachusetts Institute of Technology
- Thesis: Nonlinear dynamics of viscoelastic flows in complex geometries (1991)
- Doctoral advisor: Robert C. Armstrong
- Website: nnf.mit.edu/people/gareth-mckinley

Gareth Huw McKinley FRS is Professor of Teaching Innovation in the Department of Mechanical Engineering at Massachusetts Institute of Technology (MIT).

== Education ==
McKinley was educated at the University of Cambridge where he was awarded a Bachelor of Arts (BA) degree followed by a Master of Engineering (MEng) degree as a student of Downing College, Cambridge. He moved to America to complete his PhD at Massachusetts Institute of Technology supervised by Robert C. Armstrong.

== Research and career ==
McKinley's work focuses on understanding the rheology of complex fluids such as surfactants, gels and polymers, which are ubiquitous in foods and consumer products. His research interests include non-Newtonian fluid dynamics, microfluidics, extensional rheology, field-responsive materials, super-hydrophobicity and the wetting of nanostructured surfaces.

McKinley served as director of MIT's program in polymer science & Technology (PPST)- now Program in Polymers & Soft Matter (PPSM) - from 2004-2009. McKinley is also co-founder of Cambridge Polymer Group, a Boston-based company employing 20 people and specializing in bespoke instrumentation, materials consulting and orthopedic polymeric materials.

=== Awards and honours ===
McKinley was awarded the 2013 Bingham Medal from the Society of Rheology and the 2014 Gold Medal of the British Society of Rheology. He served as editor of the Journal of Non-Newtonian Fluid Mechanics (JNNFM) from 1999 to 2009. A passionate educator, he has won the Bose Award for Teaching and the Jacob Pieter Den Hartog Outstanding Educator Award from MIT. He was elected a member of the National Academy of Engineering of the United States in 2019 for “contributions in rheology, understanding of complex fluid dynamical instabilities, and interfacial engineering of superrepellent textured surfaces.” He is a Fellow of the Royal Society.
