= Fred Rouse =

Fred Rouse may refer to:

- Fred Rouse (gridiron football) (born 1985), gridiron football wide receiver
- Fred Rouse (footballer) (1881–1953), English footballer
- Fred Rouse, 1921 lynching victim, see lynching of Fred Rouse
