= Richard S. Stein =

American scientist (1925–2021)

Richard S. Stein (August 21, 1925 – June 21, 2021) was an American scientist.

Stein completed undergraduate at Brooklyn Polytechnic, where he performed some of the first studies of the dimensions of polymer molecules in solution using light scattering. Stein joined the faculty of University of Massachusetts Amherst in 1950 as an assistant professor and initiated its polymer program. He started the university's Polymer Research Institute, which evolved into the Polymer Science and Engineering Department. Stein later served as Emeritus Goessmann Professor of Chemistry. He was elected to membership in the National Academies of Sciences and of Engineering. He was a Fulbright Visiting Professor at Kyoto University. From 1948 to 1949, he was a National Research Council Fellow at Cambridge University, and from 1949 to 1950, he was Research Associate at Princeton University.

He was awarded the Bingham Medal by the Society of Rheology in 1972.

He died on June 21, 2021.
