= Prince E. Rouse =

American physical chemist (1917–2003)

Prince Earl Rouse Jr. (October 12, 1917 – August 10, 2003) was an American physical chemist. He received his PhD from the University of Illinois in 1941.

Rouse is most famous for a 1953 publication in which he introduced what is now known as the Rouse model of polymer dynamics. He was awarded the Bingham Medal in 1966 by the Society of Rheology.
