= Mirta Aranguren =

Argentine chemist (born 1958)

- Born: 18 January 1958 (age 68)
- Occupation: Chemical engineer
- Awards: Guggenheim Fellowship (2008); Konex Award (2023)

Academic background
- Education: National University of Mar del Plata; University of Minnesota
- Thesis: Morphology and Rheology of Silica Reinforced Silicone Rubbers (1990)
- Doctoral advisor: Christopher Macosko

Academic work
- Discipline: Chemistry
- Sub-discipline: Polymer science
- Institutions: National University of Mar del Plata; National Scientific and Technical Research Council

Mirta Ines Aranguren (born 18 January 1958) is an Argentine chemical engineer who studies polymers. A 2008 Guggenheim Fellow and 2023 Konex Award winner, she is professor emeritus at the National University of Mar del Plata and has worked as a superior investigator at the National Scientific and Technical Research Council (CONICET).

== Biography ==
Mirta Ines Aranguren was born on 18 January 1958. She attended the National University of Mar del Plata (UNMdP), where she obtained her BS in chemical engineering in 1980, and the University of Minnesota, where she obtained her PhD in chemical engineering in 1990; her doctoral dissertation Morphology and Rheology of Silica Reinforced Silicone Rubbers (1990) was supervised by Christopher Macosko.

After studying thermosetting polymers at the Institute of Materials Science and Technology Research on a CONICET Fellowship, she returned to the UNMdP and started working at their Department of Chemical and Food Engineering as an adjunct professor, being promoted to associate professor in 1994 and full professor in 2010. She ceased being full professor in 2020 and became professor emeritus in 2022. She also worked as a researcher at CONICET from 1992 until 2020, being promoted to principal investigator in 2005 and superior investigator in 2013.

As an academic, she studies modified thermosets and vegetable-reinforced polymer composites, introducing research on the subject to her native country. In addition to several grants from the International Foundation for Science and The World Academy of Sciences, she won the 1996 IFS/King Baudouin Award, the last time it was awarded. In 2008, she was awarded a Guggenheim Fellowship, becoming the first Latin American woman to receive one in chemistry; this grant was allocated to research on nanocellulose-reinforced smart polyurethanes.

In 2014, the Buenos Aires Province Senate awarded her the Outstanding Women of the Buenos Aires Province silver medal. In 2018, she was awarded the National Academy of Exact, Physical and Natural Sciences's Consecration Award in Engineering and Technology Sciences. In 2023, she won the Konex Award in Engineering.
