= Ballauff =

Ballauff is a surname. Notable people with the surname include:

- Peter Ballauff (born 1963), German tennis player
- Matthias Ballauff (born 1952), German chemist and physicist
