= Robert C. Armstrong =

American chemical engineer

Robert Armstrong
- Born: Robert Calvin Armstrong
- Education: Georgia Institute of Technology (BChE, 1970); University of Wisconsin–Madison (PhD, 1973)
- Known for: Rheology, non-Newtonian fluid mechanics
- Awards: Bingham Medal (2006); National Academy of Engineering (2008); American Academy of Arts and Sciences (2020)
- Scientific career
- Fields: Rheology
- Workplaces: Massachusetts Institute of Technology
- Thesis: Obtaining constitutive equations for macro-molecular fluids from molecular theories (1973)
- Doctoral advisor: Robert Byron Bird
- Doctoral students: Gareth H. McKinley
- Website: energy.mit.edu/profile/robert-armstrong

Robert Calvin Armstrong is an American chemical engineer known for his work in rheology and non-Newtonian fluid mechanics. He served as director of the Massachusetts Institute of Technology Energy Initiative from 2013 to 2023 and is the Chevron Professor of Chemical Engineering, emeritus, at MIT.

== Education and career ==
Armstrong received a Bachelor of Chemical Engineering degree from the Georgia Institute of Technology in 1970 and a PhD in chemical engineering from the University of Wisconsin–Madison in 1973.

He joined the MIT faculty in 1973, and he served as head of the Department of Chemical Engineering from 1996 to 2007. From 2013 to 2023, Armstrong served as director of the MIT Energy Initiative (MITEI), after having been the organization's initial deputy director from its founding in 2007.

Armstrong's research has focused on polymer fluid mechanics and the rheology of complex materials. He co-authored the two-volume textbook Dynamics of Polymeric Liquids: Vol. 1: Fluid Mechanics with R. B. Bird and O. Hassager, and Vol. 2: Kinetic Theory with R. B. Bird, C. F. Curtiss, and O. Hassager.

== Honors ==
Armstrong received the Bingham Medal from the Society of Rheology in 2006. He was elected a member of the National Academy of Engineering in 2008 for “conducting outstanding research on non-Newtonian fluid mechanics, co-authoring landmark textbooks, and providing leadership in chemical engineering education.” In 2020, he became a fellow of the American Academy of Arts and Sciences.
