= Bingham Medal =

The Bingham Medal is an annual award for outstanding contributions to the field of rheology awarded at the Annual Meeting of The Society of Rheology. It was instituted in 1948 by the society to commemorate Eugene C. Bingham (1878–1945).

== List of Award Winners ==
Source : Society of Rheology

- 1948 Melvin Mooney
- 1949 Henry Eyring
- 1950 William F. Fair, Jr., Koppers Co.
- 1951 Percy Williams Bridgman
- 1952 Arpad L. Nadai, Westinghouse Electric
- 1953 John D. Ferry
- 1954 Turner Alfrey, Dow Chemical Co
- 1955 Herbert Leaderman, National Bureau of Standards
- 1956 Arthur V. Tobolsky
- 1957 Clarence Zener
- 1958 Ronald Rivlin
- 1959 Egon Orowan
- 1960 Bruno Zimm, University of California at San Diego
- 1961 William R. Willets, Titanium Pigment Corp.
- 1962 Wladimir Philippoff, New Jersey Inst. of Technology
- 1963 Clifford A. Truesdell
- 1964 Jan M. Burgers
- 1965 Eugene Guth
- 1966 Prince E. Rouse, Los Alamos Scientific Lab.
- 1967 Hershel Markovitz, Mellon Institute
- 1968 Jerald L. Ericksen
- 1969 Stanley G. Mason, McGill University
- 1970 Anton Peterlin
- 1971 Arthur S. Lodge
- 1972 Richard S. Stein
- 1973 Robert Simha, Case Western Reserve University
- 1974 Robert B. Bird
- 1975 Alan N. Gent, University of Akron
- 1976 Lawrence E. Nielsen, Monsanto Company
- 1977 Arthur B. Metzner
- 1978 Thor L. Smith, IBM, Almaden Research Center
- 1979 William W. Graessley, Northwestern University
- 1980 Howard Brenner
- 1981 James L. White, University of Akron
- 1982 Edward B. Bagley, USDA, Northern Regional Research Center
- 1983 Frederick R. Eirich, Polytechnic Institute of New York
- 1984 Bernard D. Coleman, Rutgers University
- 1985 Roger S. Porter, University of Massachusetts-Amherst
- 1986 Morton M. Denn, University of California at Berkeley
- 1987 Charles F. Curtiss, University of Wisconsin-Madison
- 1988 William R. Schowalter, Princeton University
- 1989 Irvin M. Krieger, Case Western Reserve University
- 1990 Guy C. Berry, Carnegie Mellon University
- 1991 Louis J. Zapas, National Bureau of Standards
- 1992 Kurt F. Wissbrun, Hoechst-Celanese Company
- 1993 Daniel D. Joseph
- 1994 Andreas Acrivos
- 1995 Donald J. Plazek, University of Pittsburgh
- 1996 Horst Henning Winter, University of Massachusetts
- 1997 Gerald G. Fuller
- 1998 John M. Dealy, McGill University
- 1999 William B. Russel
- 2000 L. Gary Leal, University of California at Santa Barbara
- 2001 Masao Doi, Nagoya University
- 2002 Ronald G. Larson, University of Michigan
- 2003 Giuseppe Marrucci, University of Naples
- 2004 Chris W. Macosko
- 2005 Jan Mewis, Katholieke Universiteit Leuven
- 2006 Robert C. Armstrong, MIT
- 2007 J. F. Brady
- 2008 Hans Christian Öttinger, ETH Zürich
- 2009 Gregory B. McKenna, Texas Tech University
- 2010 Tom C. B. McLeish, Durham University
- 2011 Eric S. G. Shaqfeh, Stanford University
- 2012 Ralph H. Colby, Penn State University
- 2013 Gareth H. McKinley, MIT
- 2014 Norman J. Wagner, University of Delaware
- 2015 Hiroshi Watanabe, Kyoto University
- 2016 Michael Cates, University of Cambridge
- 2017 Julia A. Kornfield, California Institute of Technology
- 2018 Michael Rubinstein, Duke University
- 2019 Dimitris Vlassopoulos, University of Crete and IESL-FORTH
- 2020 Ole Hassager, Technical University of Denmark
- 2021 Jan Vermant, ETH Zurich
- 2022 Wilson Poon, University of Edinburgh
- 2023 Jeffrey F. Morris, CUNY City College of New York
- 2024 Michael D. Graham, University of Wisconsin-Madison
- 2025 Antony N. Beris, University of Delaware
- 2026 Roger T. Bonnecaze, The University of Texas

== See also ==
- List of physics awards
