= Jacinta C. Conrad =

American soft matter physicist

- Born: Eugene, Oregon, USA
- Awards: Fellow, American Physical Society; Fellow, American Association for the Advancement of Science

Academic background
- Education: SB, Mathematics, 1999, University of Chicago; M.A. Physics, 2002, PhD, 2005, Harvard University
- Thesis: Mechanical response and dynamic arrest in colloidal glasses and gels (2005)

Jacinta Carmel Conrad is an American soft matter physicist. She is the Frank M. Tiller Professor of Chemical and Biomolecular Engineering at the University of Houston. Conrad was elected a fellow of the American Physical Society in 2022 and a 2024 fellow of the American Association for the Advancement of Science.

== Early life and education ==
Conrad was raised in Eugene, Oregon, USA, where she attended South Eugene High School. As a senior, she was a finalist for the Westinghouse science final, becoming one of two Oregonians in a decade to make the finals of the national contest. Conrad later stated that she became involved in science in part because of a "transformative research experience" in high school. Following high school, Conrad enrolled at the University of Chicago for her undergraduate degree in mathematics. Upon graduating in 1999, she then enrolled at Harvard University for her master's degree and PhD. Upon earning her PhD, Conrad completed her post-doctoral research position at the University of Illinois Urbana-Champaign in 2009.

== Career ==
Following her post-doctoral work, Conrad joined the Department of Chemical and Biomolecular Engineering at the University of Houston in 2010 as an assistant professor. In this role, she continued to expand on her postdoctoral research by publishing a paper detailing a then-newly discovered method that bacteria used to move. Her research team found that Pilus were used by some bacteria to pull themselves upright and "walk" across a surface. She later built on this finding by discovering that the bacteria used the pili as grappling hooks by employing them in a "slingshot" motion to move. Conrad's research into new methods of bacteria motility and movement earned her the National Science Foundation CAREER Award in 2012. The award granted her five years of funding to study how bacteria movement influences the formation of biofilms, colonies of bacteria that are extremely difficult to remove once they have formed.

Conrad's work in colloid and interfacial science earned her funding from the Gulf of Mexico Research Initiative in response to the Deepwater Horizon oil spill. Her funding was aimed at determining how the use of dispersants to break up an oil spill affects the natural cleaning role played by bacteria. As the Ernest J. and Barbara Henley Associate Professor of chemical and biomolecular engineering, Conrad became a UH Energy Fellow and received a UH Women and Gender Resource Center Distinguished Faculty Scholar award. In 2021, as the Frank M. Tiller Professor, Conrad was elected a Fellow of the Society of Rheology.

Conrad was elected a fellow of the American Physical Society in 2022 for "experimental contributions to understanding nanoparticle dynamics, bacterial adhesion, and colloid-polymer mixtures, using advanced microscopy and light scattering techniques." Conrad was elected a 2024 fellow of the American Association for the Advancement of Science (Section on Physics).
