= Deborah number =

Dimensionless number in rheology

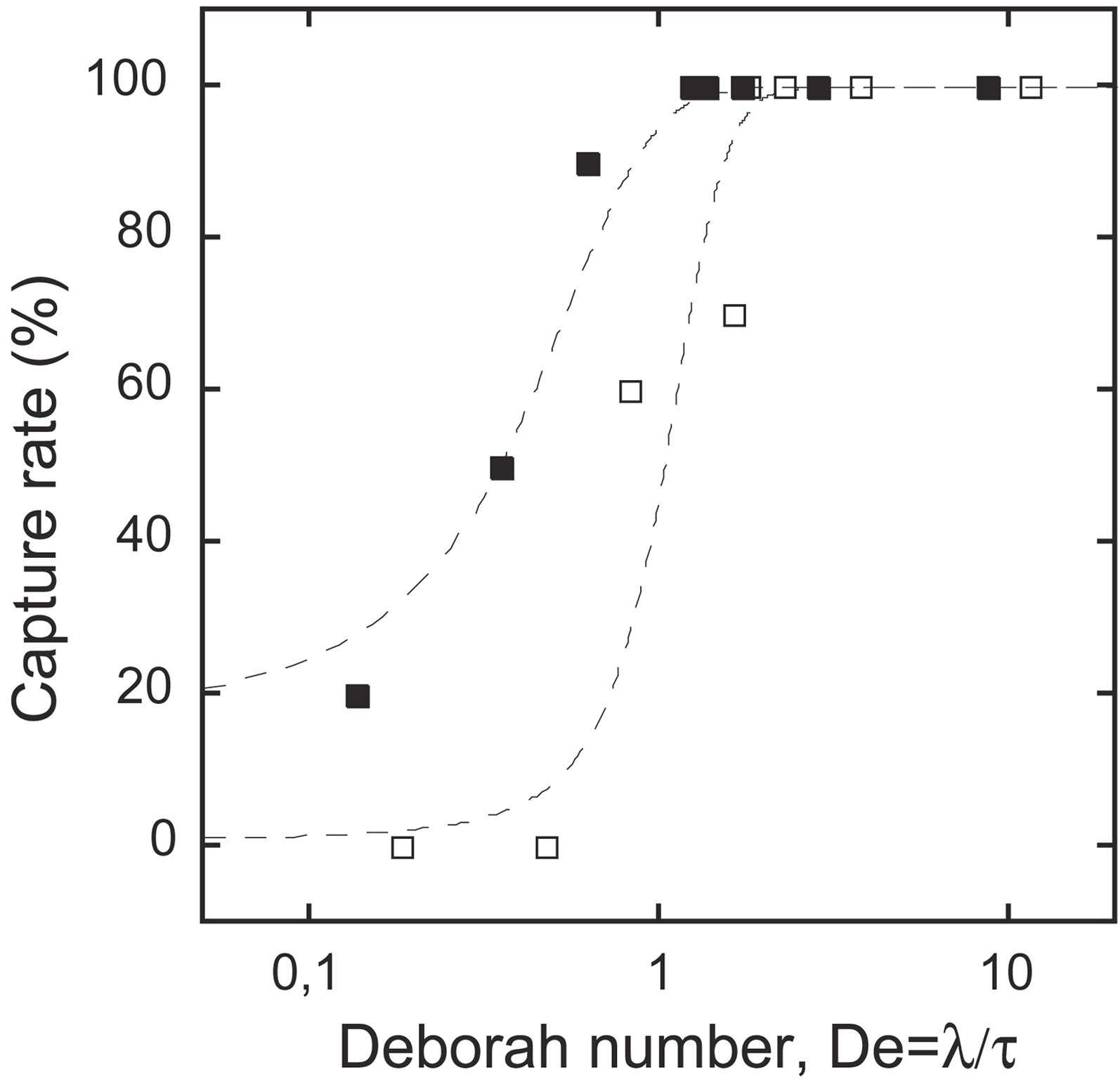
Capture rate of flies (empty squares) and ants (filled squares) by a pitcher plant as a function of the Deborah number (De), defined as the ratio of the fluid elastic relaxation time (λ) to the typical half-period of the swimming stroke of insects in the fluid (τ). For each insect category, the capture rate decreases rapidly when De < 1, suggesting that trapping occurs when the elastic forces created by the insect's movements have no time to relax.

The Deborah number (De) is a dimensionless number, often used in rheology to characterize the fluidity of materials under specific flow conditions. It quantifies the observation that given enough time even a solid-like material might flow, or a fluid-like material can act solid when it is deformed rapidly enough. Materials that have low relaxation times flow easily and as such show relatively rapid stress decay.

The Deborah number was originally proposed by Markus Reiner, a professor at Technion in Israel, who chose the name inspired by a verse in the Bible, stating "The mountains flowed before the Lord" in a song by the prophetess Deborah in the Book of Judges; הָרִ֥ים נָזְל֖וּ מִפְּנֵ֣י יְהוָ֑ה hā-rîm nāzəlū mippənê Yahweh).

== Definition ==
The Deborah number is the ratio of fundamentally different characteristic times. The Deborah number is defined as the ratio of the time it takes for a material to adjust to applied stresses or deformations, and the characteristic time scale of an experiment (or a computer simulation) probing the response of the material:

$$\mathrm{De} = \frac{t_\mathrm{c}}{t_\mathrm{p}},$$

where t_{c} stands for the relaxation time and t_{p} for the "time of observation", typically taken to be the time scale of the process.

The numerator, relaxation time, is the time needed for a reference amount of deformation to occur under a suddenly applied reference load (a more fluid-like material will therefore require less time to flow, giving a lower Deborah number relative to a solid subjected to the same loading rate).

The denominator, material time, is the amount of time required to reach a given reference strain (a faster loading rate will therefore reach the reference strain sooner, giving a higher Deborah number).

Equivalently, the relaxation time is the time required for the stress induced, by a suddenly applied reference strain, to reduce by a certain reference amount. The relaxation time is actually based on the rate of relaxation that exists at the moment of the suddenly applied load.

This incorporates both the elasticity and viscosity of the material. At lower Deborah numbers, the material behaves in a more fluidlike manner, with an associated Newtonian viscous flow. At higher Deborah numbers, the material behavior enters the non-Newtonian regime, increasingly dominated by elasticity and demonstrating solidlike behavior.

For example, for a Hookean elastic solid, the relaxation time t_{c} will be infinite and it will vanish for a Newtonian viscous fluid. For liquid water, t_{c} is typically 10^{−12} s, for lubricating oils passing through gear teeth at high pressure it is of the order of 10^{−6} s and for polymers undergoing plastics processing, the relaxation time will be of the order of a few seconds. Therefore, depending on the situation, these liquids may exhibit elastic properties, departing from purely viscous behavior.

While De is similar to the Weissenberg number and is often confused with it in technical literature, they have different physical interpretations. The Weissenberg number indicates the degree of anisotropy or orientation generated by the deformation, and is appropriate to describe flows with a constant stretch history, such as simple shear. In contrast, the Deborah number should be used to describe flows with a non-constant stretch history, and physically represents the rate at which elastic energy is stored or released.

== History ==
The Deborah number was originally proposed by Markus Reiner, a professor at Technion in Israel, who chose the name inspired by a verse in the Bible, stating "The mountains flowed before the Lord" in a song by the prophetess Deborah in the Book of Judges; הָרִ֥ים נָזְל֖וּ מִפְּנֵ֣י יְהוָ֑ה hā-rîm nāzəlū mippənê Yahweh). In his 1964 paper (a reproduction of his after-dinner speech to the Fourth International Congress on Rheology in 1962), Markus Reiner further elucidated the name's origin:

“Deborah knew two things. First, that the mountains flow, as everything flows. But, secondly, that they flowed before the Lord, and not before man, for the simple reason that man in his short lifetime cannot see them flowing, while the time of observation of God is infinite. We may therefore well define a nondimensional number the Deborah number D = time of relaxation/time of observation.”

== Time-temperature superposition ==
The Deborah number is particularly useful in conceptualizing the time–temperature superposition principle. Time-temperature superposition has to do with altering experimental time scales using reference temperatures to extrapolate temperature-dependent mechanical properties of polymers. A material at low temperature with a long experimental or relaxation time behaves like the same material at high temperature and short experimental or relaxation time if the Deborah number remains the same. This can be particularly useful when working with materials which relax on a long time scale under a certain temperature. The practical application of this idea arises in the Williams–Landel–Ferry equation. Time-temperature superposition avoids the inefficiency of measuring a polymer's behavior over long periods of time at a specified temperature by utilizing the Deborah number.
