= Norman J. Wagner =

American engineer

- Education: Princeton University (Ph.D., 1988); Carnegie Mellon University (Bachelors, 1984)
- Scientific career
- Fields: Chemical Engineering; Rheology; Colloids; Non-Newtonian fluids Complex fluids Manned Space Exploration; Particle technology Nanotechnology; Neutron scattering Brownian motion
- Workplaces: University of Delaware
- Doctoral advisor: William B. Russel

Norman J. Wagner is an American engineer, currently the UNIDEL Robert L. Pigford Chair of Chemical and Biomolecular engineering at the University of Delaware. He holds a joint professorship to the Department of Physics and Astronomy as well as a professorship in the Department of Biomechanics and Movement Science.

== Education ==
He gained a bachelor's degree at Carnegie Mellon University in 1984. He was awarded a doctorate in 1988 at Princeton University and a Director's Postdoctoral Fellowship, Los Alamos National Laboratory, in 1990.

== Career ==
He served as chair of the Chemical and Biomolecular Engineering Department at the University of Delaware from 2007 to 2012. He has held visiting professorship at ETH Zurich (1997) and the University of Rome (2004).

== Awards ==
He was awarded the Bingham Medal in 2014 by the Society of Rheology. He received the Sustained Research Prize in 2018 from the Neutron Scattering Society of America.
