= Maria Santore =

American materials scientist

Maria Monica Santore is an American materials scientist whose research involves the surfaces of soft materials, including adhesion, lubrication, membrane assembly, and nanoscale patterns on the surfaces of microparticles. She is a professor of polymer science and engineering at the University of Massachusetts Amherst.

== Education and career ==
Santore majored in chemical engineering at Carnegie Mellon University, graduating in 1985. She completed a Ph.D. in chemical engineering at Princeton University in 1989, under the supervision of William B. Russel.

She was a postdoctoral researcher at the National Institute of Standards and Technology before joining Lehigh University as a Dana Assistant Professor of Chemical Engineering. She earned tenure at Lehigh as an associate professor, and was named the Class of 1961 Chaired Associate Professor, before moving to the University of Massachusetts Amherst as a full professor.

== Recognition ==
Santore was named as a Fellow of the American Physical Society (APS) in 2005, after a nomination from the APS Division of Polymer Physics, "for elegant fundamental experiments elucidating polymer and protein dynamics at interfaces and their roles in colloidal and biomaterial adhesion". She is a 2010 Fellow of the American Chemical Society in its Division of Polymeric Materials Science and Engineering, and a 2012 Fellow of the American Association for the Advancement of Science.
