= Howard Brenner =

American chemical engineering professor

- Born: 16 March 1929
- Died: 17 February 2014 (aged 84)
- Education: Pratt Institute, New York University
- Scientific career
- Fields: Chemical Engineering, Fluid Dynamics
- Workplaces: Massachusetts Institute of Technology

Howard Brenner (16 March 1929 – 17 February 2014) was a professor emeritus of chemical engineering at Massachusetts Institute of Technology. His research profoundly influenced the field of fluid dynamics, and his research contribution to fundamental principles of fluid dynamics has been deeply honored. His first textbook, Low Reynolds Number Hydrodynamics (with Happel; Prentice-Hall, 1965), earned him a reputation lasting several decades. His profession though fundamental research is on microfluidics, complex liquids, interfacial transport process, emulsion rheology, and multiphase flows.

== Career ==
Brenner earned his bachelor's degree from Pratt Institute (1950), and his master's (1954) and DEngSc (1957) from New York University, both in chemical engineering. He has served on the chemical engineering faculties of New York University (1955–1966), Carnegie Mellon University (1966–1977), University of Rochester (1977–1981, department chair), and MIT (1981–2005). Since 1981, he was a professor at the Massachusetts Institute of Technology (William Henry Dow Professor). He was a visiting professor at the University of Minnesota, Caltech (Fairchild Scholar 1975/76, Chevron Visiting Professor 1988/89), and Technion (Visiting Professor of Mechanical Engineering 1996).

== Honors and awards ==
He received the 2001 Fluid Dynamics Prize from the Division of Fluid Dynamics of the American Physical Society, the 1980 Bingham Medal of the Society of Rheology and the Warren K. Lewis Award (1999) from the American Institute of Chemical Engineers. He was a member of the National Academy of Engineering (1980) and National Academy of Sciences (2000). He was elected as the fellow of the American Academy of Arts and Sciences (1999), the American Association for the Advancement of Science, and the American Institute of Chemical Engineers.
