= Donald R. Paul =

Donald R. Paul is an American materials scientist and engineer currently the Ernest Cockrell Sr. Chair in Engineering at University of Texas at Austin. His interests are polymer engineering, biomaterials and membranes. An expert in his field, he was Elected to the National Academy of Engineering in 1988 and also has been Elected to the American Institute of Chemical Engineers and American Chemical Society.

== Education ==
He earned his B.S. in chemical engineering from North Carolina State University in 1961 and his Ph.D. in chemical engineering from University of Wisconsin in 1965.

== Selected publications ==
- Y. T. Sung, P. D. Fasulo, W. R. Rodgers, Y. T. Yoo, Y. Yoo and D. R. Paul, "Properties of Polycarbonate/Acrylonitrile-butadiene-styrene/Talc Composites," J. Appl. Polym. Sci., 124, 1020 (2012).
- C. H. Lau, D. R. Paul and T. S. Chung, "Molecular Design of Nanohybrid Gas Separation Membranes for Optimal CO2 Separation," Polymer, 53, 454 (2012).
- M. W. Spencer, M. D. Wetzel, C. Troeltzsch and D. R. Paul, "Effects of Acid Neutralization on the Properties of K+ and Na+ Poly(ethylene-co-methacrylic acid) Ionomers," Polymer, 53, 569 (2012).
- M. W. Spencer, M. D. Wetzel, C. Troeltzsch and D. R. Paul, "Effects of Acid Neutralization on the Morphology and Properties of Organoclay Nanocomposites formed from K+ and Na+ Poly(ethylene-co-methacrylic acid) Ionomers," Polymer, 53, 555 (2012).
- R. R. Tiwari and D. R. Paul, "Polypropylene-Elastomer (TPO) Nanocomposites: 3. Ductile-brittle Transition Temperature," Polymer, 53, 823 (2012).
