= Roseanna Zia =

American mechanical engineer

Roseanna N. Zia is an American mechanical engineer who applies her expertise in the dynamics of colloids in building a physics-based model of biological cells. She is Dave Wollersheim Professor of Mechanical and Aerospace Engineering at the University of Missouri.

== Education and career ==
Zia was an undergraduate at the University of Missouri, where she majored in mechanical engineering. After a master's degree in mechanical engineering from the University of Michigan, she completed a Ph.D. in mechanical engineering at the California Institute of Technology in 2011, supervised by John F. Brady. Her dissertation was Individual particle motion in colloids: Microviscosity, microdiffusivity, and normal stresses.

Next, she became a postdoctoral researcher at Princeton University, working with William B. Russel. She became a faculty member at Cornell University from 2013 to 2017, and then in chemical engineering at Stanford University, until returning to the University of Missouri as Wollersheim Professor in 2023.

== Recognition ==
Zia is a recipient of the National Science Foundation CAREER Award and the Office of Naval Research Young Investigator Award, a Sloan Research Fellow, and a double recipient of the Presidential Early Career Award for Scientists and Engineers.

In 2025 she was named as a Fellow of the American Physical Society (APS), after a nomination from the APS Division of Biological Physics, "for pioneering contributions to the physics of soft and biological matter, including the development of colloidal models that reveal the physical principles governing intracellular transport and whole-cell dynamics".
