= Tobolsky =

Tobolsky (masculine), Tobolskaya (feminine), Tobolskoye (neuter), or Tobolskiye (plural) may refer to:

- Tobolsky District, a district of Tyumen Oblast, Russia
- Tobolsky Uyezd, an uyezd of Tobolsk Governorate, Russian Empire
- Tobolsky (rural locality), a rural locality (a settlement) in Svetlinsky District of Orenburg Oblast, Russia
- Tobolskaya, a rural locality (a village) in Karagaysky District of Perm Krai, Russia
- Tobolskiye, a rural locality (a village) in Orlovsky District of Kirov Oblast, Russia

== Surname ==
- Arthur V. Tobolsky (1919–1972), an American chemistry professor
- Jeff Tobolski (1964–2025), an American politician
- Paweł Tobolski (1906–1944), a Royal Air Force officer
- Piotr Tobolski (born 1958), a Polish rower

== See also ==
- Tobolsk, a town in Tyumen Oblast, Russia
