= John D. Ferry =

Canadian-American chemist and biochemist

John Douglass Ferry
- Born: May 4, 1912; Dawson City, Yukon Territory, Canada
- Died: October 18, 2002 (aged 90)
- Education: Stanford University (BA, PhD)
- Known for: Study of motional dynamics in macromolecular systems
- Awards: Charles Goodyear Medal of the American Chemical Society
- Scientific career
- Fields: Chemistry and biochemistry
- Workplaces: Harvard University, University of Wisconsin–Madison

John Douglass Ferry (May 4, 1912 – October 18, 2002) was a Canadian-born American chemist and biochemist noted for development of surgical products from blood plasma and for studies of the chemistry of large molecules. Along with Williams and Landel, Ferry co-authored the work on time-temperature superposition in which the now famous WLF equation first appeared. The National Academy of Sciences called Ferry "a towering figure in polymer science". The University of Wisconsin said that he was "undoubtedly the most widely recognized research pioneer in the study of motional dynamics in macromolecular systems by viscoelastic techniques".

== Education ==
Ferry was born in Dawson City, Yukon Territory, Canada, and attended a one-room school in Murray, Idaho. At age 19, Ferry received his bachelor of arts degree at Stanford University in 1932. Three years later, he received his Ph.D at Stanford and became a research assistant at Stanford's Hopkins Marine Station.

== Career ==
In 1937, Ferry was an instructor of biochemical sciences at Harvard University. He was also a Junior Fellow of the Society of Fellows at Harvard.

He became an assistant professor in the Department of Chemistry of the University of Wisconsin–Madison in 1946 and was made a full professor the following year. He continued teaching there until his retirement in 1982. Ferry was chairman of the Department of Chemistry at University of Wisconsin–Madison from 1959 to 1967. He was a founding member of the Rheology Research Center at Wisconsin. In 1973 Ferry was a Farrington Daniels Research Professor.

== Professional memberships ==
He was affiliated with the following organizations:

- National Academy of Sciences member
- Chairman of the Committee on Macromolecular Chemistry of the National Research Council
- President of the Society of Rheology

== Awards ==
Ferry received the following notable awards and distinctions:

- Eli Lilly Award in Biological Chemistry of the American Chemical Society
- Bingham Medal of the Society of Rheology
- Colloid Chemistry Award of the American Chemical Society
- High Polymer Physics Prize of the American Physical Society
- Colwyn medal in 1971 of the Institution of the Rubber Industry
- Witco Award in Polymer Chemistry of the American Chemical Society
- Technical Award of the International Institute of Synthetic Rubber Producers
- Charles Goodyear Medal of the Rubber Division of the American Chemical Society
