= Jan Vermant =

Belgian chemical engineer and materials scientist

- Born: 1968 (age 57–58); Belgium
- Education: KU Leuven
- Awards: Weissenberg Award, Bingham Medal, Fellow of the Royal Society of Chemistry
- Scientific career
- Fields: Chemical engineering, Soft matter physics
- Workplaces: ETH Zurich
- Doctoral advisor: Jan Mewis

Jan Vermant (born 1968) is a Belgian chemical engineer and professor of soft materials at ETH Zurich. He has contributed to rheology, colloid science, soft matter physics, active matter, and interfacial phenomena. Since 2014, he has led the Laboratory of Soft Materials at ETH Zurich and serves as the Vice Rector for Curriculum Development.

== Education and career ==
Vermant earned his M.S. in chemical engineering from KU Leuven in 1991 and completed his Ph.D. in 1996 under the supervision of Jan Mewis. In 2000, he joined the faculty of Chemical Engineering at KU Leuven, becoming a full professor in 2005. In 2014, he moved to the Department of Materials at ETH Zurich. Since September 2023 he is prorector for curricula development at the same institution.

== Research ==
Vermant's research focuses on the rheology and physics of complex fluids, colloidal suspensions, and fluid-fluid interfaces. He developed experimental methods to study interfacial rheology, including the double-wall ring rheometer. He has worked has on particle-laden interfaces, pickering emulsions, biological monolayers, and soft matter systems.

His recent work has extended to active matter, including studies on the self-organization of driven colloidal systems. In a 2020 study, Vermant and collaborators demonstrated light-switchable propulsion of active particles with reversible interactions.

He has also studied the physics of foams and foam stability, inspired by natural systems such as beer foam. In a 2017 study, Vermant's group presented a strategy to halt the dissolution of particle-coated air bubbles in water based on interfacial rheology design.

As of 2025, Vermant has an h-index of 73 according to Google Scholar.

== Selected publications ==
- Vutukuri, H. R., Lisicki, M., Lauga, E., & Vermant, J. (2020). Light-switchable propulsion of active particles with reversible interactions. Nature Communications, 11, 2628. https://doi.org/10.1038/s41467-020-15764-1
- Beltramo, P. J., Gupta, M., Alicke, A., Gunes, D. Z., & Vermant, J. (2017). Arresting dissolution by interfacial rheology design. Proceedings of the National Academy of Sciences, 114(39), 10364–10369. https://doi.org/10.1073/pnas.1705181114
