= Lilo Pozzo =

American chemical engineer

Lilo Danielle Pozzo
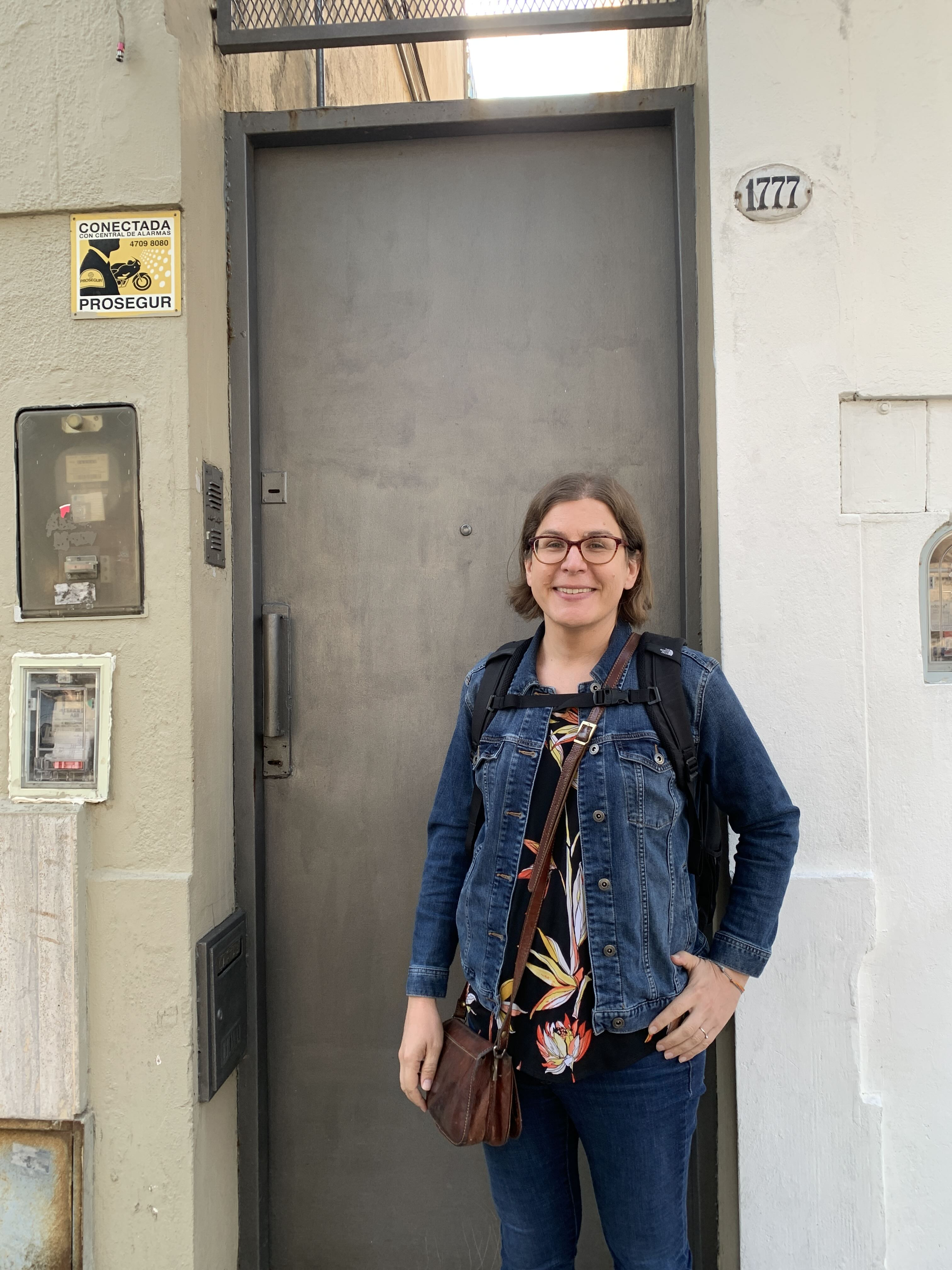
- Pozzo in 2022 outside childhood home in Argentina
- Born: Argentina
- Education: Carnegie Mellon University; University of Puerto Rico at Mayagüez
- Scientific career
- Fields: Chemical Engineering, Material Science
- Workplaces: University of Washington
- Thesis: Templating Nanoparticles using Thermo-reversible Soft Crystals (2006)
- Doctoral advisor: Lynn M. Walker

Lilo Danielle Pozzo is an American chemical engineer who is a professor of chemical engineering at the University of Washington. Her research considers the development, measurement and control of molecular self-assembly. She is interested in the realization of materials for energy storage and conversion. Pozzo serves on the editorial board of the Royal Society of Chemistry journal Digital Discovery.

== Early life and education ==
Pozzo was born in Argentina and raised in Puerto Rico. She was an undergraduate student at the University of Puerto Rico at Mayagüez where she studied chemical engineering, earning her bachelor's degree in 2001. After graduating she joined Carnegie Mellon University, where she studied Triblock copolymers as thermoreversible micellar templates for three-dimensional arrays under the supervision of Lynn M. Walker. Pozzo joined National Institute of Standards and Technology as a postdoctoral fellow.

== Research and career ==
Pozzo's research considers polymers and colloidal systems and the application of advanced characterization techniques to understand their structure-property relationships. She has applied these materials to medical imaging contrast agents and energy storage technologies.

In 2017, Pozzo and her research team launched a project in Jayuya, Puerto Rico, seeking to evaluate how extended power outages impacted the health of rural patients. In the wake of Hurricane Maria, Pozzo raised funding from people in Seattle to build renewable energy infrastructure in Puerto Rico. As part of these efforts, she installed several solar nanogrid arrays (small scale systems that can produce, store and distribute electricity) to power refrigerators.

Pozzo has also worked on data-driven materials design and high-throughput experimentation. She focuses on ways to adapt hardware and software to design new materials for clean energy and healthcare.

In 2018, Pozzo was awarded the United States Department of Energy Clean Energy, Education and Empowerment (C3E) initiative education award. The award recognizes efforts of advocates in driving uptake of clean energy technologies in society. Later that year she was honored at the Latinx Faculty Recognition Event.

In 2021–2023 Pozzo was named and served as interim chair of the Materials Science department at the University of Washington.

== Selected publications ==
- Wu, Chen-Hao; Chueh, Chu-Chen; Xi, Yu-Yin; Zhong, Hong-Liang; Gao, Guang-Peng; Wang, Zhao-Hui; Pozzo, Lilo D.; Wen, Ten-Chin; Jen, Alex K.-Y. (2015-07-24). "Influence of Molecular Geometry of Perylene Diimide Dimers and Polymers on Bulk Heterojunction Morphology Toward High-Performance Nonfullerene Polymer Solar Cells". Advanced Functional Materials. 25 (33): 5326–5332. doi:10.1002/adfm.201501971. ISSN 1616-301X. S2CID 93752655.
- Katie M Weigandt; Nathan White; Dominic Chung; Erica Ellingson; Yi Wang; Xiaoyun Fu; Danilo C Pozzo (1 December 2012). "Fibrin clot structure and mechanics associated with specific oxidation of methionine residues in fibrinogen". Biophysical Journal. 103 (11): 2399–2407. doi:10.1016/j.bpj.2012.10.036. ISSN 0006-3495. PMC 3514520. PMID 23283239. Wikidata Q36445672.
- Leslie W. Chan; Xu Wang; Hua Wei; Lilo D. Pozzo; Nathan J. White; Suzie H. Pun (1 March 2015). "A synthetic fibrin cross-linking polymer for modulating clot properties and inducing hemostasis". Science Translational Medicine. 7 (277): 277ra29. doi:10.1126/scitranslmed.3010383. ISSN 1946-6234. PMC 4470483. PMID 25739763. Wikidata Q27327667.

== Awards ==
- Anne Mayes Neutron Scattering Award, 2022
- DOE Women in Clean Energy C3E Education Award, 2018
- UW College of Engineering Distinguished Teaching Award, 2018
- UW LatinX Faculty Recognition Award, 2017
- Department of Energy Early Career Award, 2013
- University of Washington Outstanding Undergraduate Research Mentor Award, 2013
