= Noboru Tokita =

Scientist

Noboru Tokita (February 20, 1923 - October 31, 2014) was a Uniroyal and later Cabot scientist known for his work on the processing of elastomers.

== Personal ==
Tokita was born in Sapporo, Japan in 1923. He met his wife Noriko while on an exchange program at Duke University. They married and decided to stay in the United States. He was a close colleague of 2009 Charles Goodyear Medal winner James White, introducing White to his future wife Yoko Masaki.

== Education ==
Tokita completed BS degree at Tokyo University in 1948, and his Ph.D. in physics and chemistry in 1957 at the University of Hokkaido.

== Career ==
He began his professional career in 1954 as a professor of Applied Physics at Waseda University in Tokyo. He held this position until 1960 when he came to the United States on an exchange program with Duke University. At Duke, he taught polymer rheology. In the early 1960s, Tokita joined the U. S. Rubber Company in New Jersey, later Uniroyal, working there for 30 years on elastomer processing. He later joined Uniroyal Goodrich Tire Company in Akron in a research role. He joined Cabot Corporation in Billerica in 1990. During his career, he produced 9 U.S. Patents. His most cited scientific article treated the subject of morphology formation in elastomer blends.

== Awards ==
- 1994 - Melvin Mooney Distinguished Technology Award from Rubber Division of the ACS
