= Michael Cates =

British physicist (born 1961)

Michael Cates FRS FRSE HonFInstP
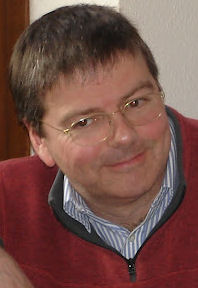
- Cates in 2012
- Born: Michael Elmhirst Cates; 5 May 1961 (age 65); Bristol, England
- Citizenship: United Kingdom
- Education: Trinity College, Cambridge (PhD)
- Awards: Maxwell Medal and Prize (1991); Paul Dirac Medal and Prize (2009); Weissenberg Award (2013); Bingham Medal (2016)
- Scientific career
- Fields: Physics; Soft matter
- Workplaces: University of Cambridge; University of Edinburgh
- Thesis: The statistical mechanics of complex polymers (1985)
- Doctoral advisor: Sir Sam Edwards

Michael Elmhirst Cates (born 5 May 1961) is a British physicist. He is the 19th Lucasian Professor of Mathematics at the University of Cambridge and has held this position since 1 July 2015. He was previously professor of natural philosophy at the University of Edinburgh, and held a Royal Society Research Professorship from 2007 to 2022.

His work focuses on the theory of soft matter, such as polymers, colloids, gels, liquid crystals, and granular material. A recurring goal of his research is to create a mathematical model that predicts the stress in a flowing material as a functional of the flow history of that material. Such a mathematical model is called a constitutive equation. He has worked on theories of active matter, particularly dense suspensions of self-propelled particles which can include motile bacteria. His interests also include fundamental field theories of active systems in which time-reversal symmetry (T-symmetry, and more generally, CPT symmetry) is absent. Such theories are characterised by non-zero steady-state entropy production. His recent work has focussed on phase separation in active systems, including phenomena such as nucleation, interfacial fluctuations, and wetting.

At Edinburgh, Cates was the principal investigator of an EPSRC Programme Grant, awarded in 2011, entitled Design Principles for New Soft Materials. On his departure for Cambridge, Cait MacPhee took over as principal investigator until conclusion of the grant in 2017. Cates remains an honorary professor at Edinburgh, where he serves on the advisory board of the Higgs Centre for Theoretical Physics.

== Early life ==
Cates was born on 5 May 1961. He read Natural Sciences and earned a PhD at Trinity College, Cambridge, in 1985, where he studied with Sam Edwards.

== Academic career ==
Cates was a research fellow and lecturer at the Cavendish Laboratory, University of Cambridge before moving to Edinburgh in 1995.

== Honours ==
Cates won the Bingham Medal of the US Society of Rheology in 2016. He had previously won the 2013 Weissenberg Award of the European Society of Rheology and the 2009 Gold Medal of the British Society of Rheology. He was awarded the 2009 Dirac Prize by the Institute of Physics. He won the 1991 Maxwell Medal and Prize. He has served as an elected member of the Council of the Royal Society; as chair of the International Scientific Committee of ESPCI ParisTech, and as a Trustee of The Cyprus Institute. He was an honorary fellow of Trinity College, Cambridge from 2013 until 2016, when he became instead a senior research fellow.

Cates was elected a member of the National Academy of Engineering in 2019 for research on the rheology, dynamics, and thermodynamics of complex fluids, and for scientific leadership in the European Community. In 2021 he was elected an International Member of the US National Academy of Sciences.

== Works ==
Michael Cates has over 400 refereed scientific publications, with over 50,000 citations. His h-index is 118.

Publications include:

- Milner, S. T.; Witten, T. A.; Cates, M. E. (1988). "Theory of the grafted polymer brush". Macromolecules. 21 (8). American Chemical Society (ACS): 2610–2619. Bibcode:1988MaMol..21.2610M. doi:10.1021/ma00186a051. ISSN 0024-9297.
- Cates, M E; Candau, S J (20 August 1990). "Statics and dynamics of worm-like surfactant micelles". Journal of Physics: Condensed Matter. 2 (33). IOP Publishing: 6869–6892. doi:10.1088/0953-8984/2/33/001. ISSN 0953-8984. S2CID 250743546.
- Cates, M. E. (1987). "Reptation of living polymers: dynamics of entangled polymers in the presence of reversible chain-scission reactions". Macromolecules. 20 (9). American Chemical Society (ACS): 2289–2296. Bibcode:1987MaMol..20.2289C. doi:10.1021/ma00175a038. ISSN 0024-9297.
- Sollich, Peter; Lequeux, François; Hébraud, Pascal; Cates, Michael E. (10 March 1997). "Rheology of Soft Glassy Materials". Physical Review Letters. 78 (10). American Physical Society (APS): 2020–2023. arXiv:cond-mat/9611228. Bibcode:1997PhRvL..78.2020S. doi:10.1103/physrevlett.78.2020. ISSN 0031-9007. S2CID 14392727.
- Cates, M. E.; Wittmer, J. P.; Bouchaud, J.-P.; Claudin, P. (31 August 1998). "Jamming, Force Chains, and Fragile Matter". Physical Review Letters. 81 (9). American Physical Society (APS): 1841–1844. arXiv:cond-mat/9803197. Bibcode:1998PhRvL..81.1841C. doi:10.1103/physrevlett.81.1841. ISSN 0031-9007. S2CID 119378758.
- Pham, K. N. (5 April 2002). "Multiple Glassy States in a Simple Model System". Science. 296 (5565). American Association for the Advancement of Science (AAAS): 104–106. Bibcode:2002Sci...296..104P. doi:10.1126/science.1068238. ISSN 0036-8075. PMID 11935020. S2CID 34313265.
- Stratford, K. (30 September 2005). "Colloidal Jamming at Interfaces: A Route to Fluid-Bicontinuous Gels". Science. 309 (5744). American Association for the Advancement of Science (AAAS): 2198–2201. arXiv:cond-mat/0510040. Bibcode:2005Sci...309.2198S. doi:10.1126/science.1116589. ISSN 0036-8075. PMID 16195456. S2CID 14719880.
- Tailleur, J.; Cates, M. E. (29 May 2008). "Statistical Mechanics of Interacting Run-and-Tumble Bacteria". Physical Review Letters. 100 (21) 218103. arXiv:0803.1069. Bibcode:2008PhRvL.100u8103T. doi:10.1103/physrevlett.100.218103. ISSN 0031-9007. PMID 18518641. S2CID 9651052.
- Wyart, M.; Cates, M. E. (6 March 2014). "Discontinuous shear thickening without inertia in dense non-Brownian suspensions". Physical Review Letters. 112 098302. arXiv:1311.4099. doi:10.1103/PhysRevLett.112.098302.
- Fodor, E.; Nardini, C.; Cates, M. E.; Tailleur, J.; Visco., P.; van Wijland, F. (13 July 2016). "How far from equilibrium is active matter?". Physical Review Letters. 117 038103. arXiv:1604.00953. doi:10.1103/PhysRevLett.117.038103.
- Tjhung, E.; Nardini, C.; Cates, M. E. (24 September 2018). "Cluster phases and bubbly phase separation in active fluids: Reversal of the Ostwald process". Physical Review X. 112 031080. arXiv:1801.07687. doi:10.1103/PhysRevX.8.031080.
