= Arthur S. Lodge =

- Born: 20 November 1922; Liverpool, England
- Died: 24 June 2005 (aged 82); Fitchburg, WI, USA
- Education: Oxford University
- Known for: Lodge rubberlike liquid constitutive equation
- Scientific career
- Fields: Rheology
- Workplaces: University of Wisconsin–Madison

Arthur Scott Lodge (20 November 1922 – 24 June 2005) was an English rheologist and the originator of the Lodge elastic liquid constitutive equation and inventor of the Lodge Stressmeter. Author of two important textbooks in rheology (Elastic Liquids and Body Tensor Fields in Continuum Mechanics) he was one of the founding members of the Rheology Research Center at the University of Wisconsin–Madison, USA.

Lodge was born in Liverpool and received his bachelor's degree in Mathematics (1945) and DPhil in Theoretical Nuclear Physics (1948) from Oxford University. In 1949, he took a position at the British Rayon Research Association, where his supervisor was Karl Weissenberg, inventor of the Weissenberg rheogoniometer. In 1961, Lodge joined the faculty of the University of Manchester Institute of Science and Technology (UMIST). In 1964, Lodge authored the text Elastic Liquids (Academic Press), and spent the academic year 1965–1966 in Madison, Wisconsin, USA as a visiting professor; in 1968 the Lodge family moved to Madison permanently. On his arrival at UW–Madison, Lodge and colleagues Bob Bird, John Ferry, John Schrag, and Millard Johnson founded the Rheology Research Center (RRC). Lodge chaired the RRC Executive Committee for 23 years until his retirement in 1991.

Elastic Liquids introduced the Lodge rubberlike liquid constitutive equation, the foundation for contemporary nonlinear viscoelasticity. The Lodge rubberlike liquid managed to explain most of what could be reliably measured at the time (other than non-constant shear viscosity) and also anticipated nonlinear behavior not reliably measured until years later, such as the Lodge-Meissner relation. In 1974, Lodge followed up Elastic Liquids with his second text, Body Tensor Fields in Continuum Mechanics (Academic Press, 1974). Lodge was an inventor and entrepreneur, designing and marketing the on-line Lodge Stressmeter, a device for making accurate measurements of shear normal stress differences using pressure-driven slit flow.

== Honours ==
Lodge was awarded the Society of Rheology Bingham Medal in 1971 and the Gold Medal of the British Society of Rheology in 1983. In 1992, he was elected to membership in the United States National Academy of Engineering.
