= Robert F. Landel =

American physical chemist (1925–2024)

Robert F. Landel (October 10, 1925 – September 10, 2024) was an American physical chemist at the Jet Propulsion Laboratory noted for his contribution to development of the Williams–Landel–Ferry equation, and for a particular form of hyperelastic energy function, the Valanis-Landel form.

== Early life and education ==
Landel was born in Pendleton, New York on October 10, 1925. He was a combat infantryman in World War II, serving in eastern France and southern Germany (1943–1946).

Landel earned an MA in 1951 and a BA in 1950, from the University of Buffalo. He completed postdoctoral research under Prof. John D. Ferry at University of Wisconsin.

== Career ==
Landel worked for Jet Propulsion Lab on solid rocket propellants as a physical chemist. He holds six patents.

== Death ==
Landel died at his home in Santa Cruz, California, on September 10, 2024, at the age of 98.

== Honors and awards ==
Robert F. Landel was elected vice president of the Society of Rheology in 1984.

In 2006, he won the Charles Goodyear Medal, bestowed by the American Chemical Society, Rubber Division to individuals who "have been the principal inventor(s), innovator(s), or developer(s) of a significant change or contribution to the rubber industry".
