= Arpad Nadai =

Hungarian academic and professor of mechanics

Arpád Ludwig Nádai (3 April 1883 – 18 July 1963) was a Hungarian-born academic who was a professor of mechanics.

== Early life and career ==
Nadai was born in Budapest, Hungary. He attended the University of Budapest for his undergraduate education. For doctorate, he went to Germany and studied at the Technische Hochschule in Charlottenburg (now Technische Universität Berlin).

After he finished his education, in 1918, he joined University of Göttingen on a professorial position and later became head of the applied mechanics laboratory.

In 1952, he received Bingham Medal for his work.

In 1975, the American Society of Mechanical Engineers (ASME) established an award, Nadai Medal, named after him.

== Publications ==
- Theory of flow and fracture of solids and Plasticity; a mechanics of the plastic state of matter

== Awards ==
- Bingham Medal (1952)
- Worcester Reed Medal
- Timoshenko Medal
- Elliott Cresson Medal
