= James White (engineer) =

American scientist

- Born: James White; January 3, 1938; Brooklyn, New York, U.S.
- Died: November 26, 2009 (aged 71)

James Lindsay White (January 3, 1938 – November 26, 2009) was an American polymer scientist.

White was a key figure in defining the field of polymer engineering. He founded two polymer engineering programs, one at the University of Tennessee and the other at the University of Akron. He also founded the International Polymer Processing Society and two scholarly journals: the Journal of Polymer Engineering and the International Polymer Processing Journal. He authored the textbook Rubber Processing, which was long popular among engineers. He published more than 500 papers and eight books based on his studies of flow in internal mixers, pin barrel extruders, and twin screw extruders with and without simultaneous chemical reactions.

He received the Charles Goodyear Medal in 2009, for “fundamental understanding of rheology and mathematical modeling of unfilled and filled rubbers and simulations of flow in batch and continuous mixing machines.” He received the Bingham Medal in 1981.

== Education ==
White obtained his BS in chemical engineering at the Brooklyn Polytechnic Institute. He then pursued graduate studies in the research group of Arthur B. Metzner at the University of Delaware, receiving his MS degree in 1962 and his doctorate in 1965. His research resulted in development of the White-Metzner rheological model, which is still widely used in polymer processing simulations.

== Career ==
- 1963-1967 - research engineer and group leader at the United States Rubber Company, where his colleague Noboru Tokita introduced White to his future wife Yoko Masaki.
- 1967-1983 - associate professor at the University of Tennessee and later founder of the school's Polymer and Engineering masters and doctorate program
- Founded the Journal of Polymer Engineering, serving as editor until 1984
- 1983-2009 - center director and department chair of the Institute and Department of Polymer Engineering at the University of Akron
- Started the Polymer Processing Society in 1985 along with the Society's journal, International Polymer Processing. He served as editor of the journal from 1986 to 2004.
