= Journal of Non-Newtonian Fluid Mechanics =

Scientific journal

- Discipline: Fluid dynamics
- Language: English
- Edited by: Jonathan Rothstein, Robert J. Poole

Publication details
- History: 1976—present
- Publisher: Elsevier
- Frequency: Monthly
- Impact factor: 2.7 (2025)

Standard abbreviations
- ISO 4: J. Non-Newton. Fluid Mech.

Indexing
- CODEN: JNFMDI
- ISSN: 0377-0257 (print); 1873-2631 (web)

Links
- Journal homepage; Online access; Online archive

Applied Mathematics Letters is a peer-reviewed scientific journal published monthly by Elsevier. Established in 1976, it covers theoretical, computational and experimental studies on non-Newtonian fluids and flowing soft matter systems. Its current editors-in-chief are Jonathan Rothstein (University of Massachusetts Amherst) and Robert J. Poole (University of Liverpool).

== Abstracting and indexing ==
The journal is abstracted and indexed in:

- Chemical Abstracts Core
- Current Contents/Engineering, Computing & Technology
- Current Contents/Physical, Chemical & Earth Sciences
- EBSCO databases
- Ei Compendex
- Inspec
- MathSciNet
- Science Citation Index Expanded
- Scopus
- zbMATH

According to the Journal Citation Reports, the journal has a 2025 impact factor of 2.7.
