= Williams–Landel–Ferry equation =

Equation in time–temperature superposition

The Williams–Landel–Ferry Equation (or WLF Equation) is an empirical equation associated with time–temperature superposition.

The WLF equation has the form

$$\log(a_T) = \frac{-C_1(T-T_\mathrm{r})}{C_2 + (T-T_\mathrm{r})}$$

where $\log(a_T)$ is the decadic logarithm of the WLF shift factor, T is the temperature, T_{r} is a reference temperature chosen to construct the compliance master curve and C_{1}, C_{2} are empirical constants adjusted to fit the values of the superposition parameter a_{T}.

The equation can be used to fit (regress) discrete values of the shift factor a_{T} vs. temperature. Here, values of shift factor a_{T} are obtained by horizontal shift log(a_{T}) of creep compliance data plotted vs. time or frequency in double logarithmic scale so that a data set obtained experimentally at temperature T superposes with the data set at temperature T_{r}. A minimum of three values of a_{T} are needed to obtain C_{1}, C_{2}, and typically more than three are used.

Once constructed, the WLF equation allows for the estimation of the temperature shift factor for temperatures other than those for which the material was tested. In this way, the master curve can be applied to other temperatures. However, when the constants are obtained with data at temperatures above the glass transition temperature (T_{g}), the WLF equation is applicable to temperatures at or above T_{g} only; the constants are positive and represent Arrhenius behavior. Extrapolation to temperatures below T_{g} is erroneous. When the constants are obtained with data at temperatures below T_{g}, negative values of C_{1}, C_{2} are obtained, which are not applicable above T_{g} and do not represent Arrhenius behavior. Therefore, the constants obtained above T_{g} are not useful for predicting the response of the polymer for structural applications, which necessarily must operate at temperatures below T_{g}.

The WLF equation is a consequence of time–temperature superposition (TTSP), which mathematically is an application of Boltzmann's superposition principle. It is TTSP, not WLF, that allows the assembly of a compliance master curve that spans more time, or frequency, than afforded by the time available for experimentation or the frequency range of the instrumentation, such as dynamic mechanical analyzer (DMA).

While the time span of a TTSP master curve is broad, according to Struik, it is valid only if the data sets did not suffer from ageing effects during the test time. Even then, the master curve represents a hypothetical material that does not age. Effective Time Theory. needs to be used to obtain useful prediction for long term time.

Having data above T_{g}, it is possible to predict the behavior (compliance, storage modulus, etc.) of viscoelastic materials for temperatures T>T_{g}, and/or for times/frequencies longer/slower than the time available for experimentation. With the master curve and associated WLF equation it is possible to predict the mechanical properties of the polymer out of time scale of the machine (typically $10^{-2}$ to $10^2$ Hz), thus extrapolating the results of multi-frequency analysis to a broader range, out of measurement range of machine.

== Predicting the Effect of Temperature on Viscosity by the WLF Equation ==
The Williams-Landel-Ferry model, or WLF for short, is usually used for polymer melts or other fluids that have a glass transition temperature.

The model is:

$$\mu(T)\,=\,\mu_0 10^ \left( \frac {-C_1 (T-T_r)} {C_2+ T -T_r} \right)$$

where T-temperature, $C_1$, $C_2$, $T_r$ and $\mu_0$ are empiric parameters (only three of them are independent from each other).

If one selects the parameter $T_r$ based on the glass transition temperature, then the parameters $C_1$, $C_2$ become very similar for the wide class of polymers. Typically, if $T_r$ is set to match the glass transition temperature $T_g$, we get

$C_1 \approx$17.44

and

$C_2 \approx 51.6$ K.

Van Krevelen recommends to choose

$T_r\,=\,T_g+43$ K, then

$$C_1 \approx 8.86$$

and

$C_2 \approx$101.6 K.

Using such universal parameters allows one to guess the temperature dependence of a polymer by knowing the viscosity at a single temperature.

In reality the universal parameters are not that universal, and it is much better to fit the WLF parameters to the experimental data, within the temperature range of interest.
