= Glenn Lipscomb =

American chemical engineer

Dr. G. Glenn Lipscomb is an American chemical engineer, and Distinguished University Professor in Chemical Engineering at the University of Toledo.

== Education and career ==
Lipscomb received his BS in chemical engineering from the University of Missouri-Rolla in 1981. After working for Dow Chemical, he continued his education with a Ph.D. from the University of California, Berkeley in 1989.

He was an assistant professor at the University of Cincinnati from 1989 to 1994, when he moved to the University of Toledo. He was promoted to associate professor in 1995 and to full professor in 1999. He served as department chair from 2004 to 2019.

== Recognition ==
In 2007, the Missouri University of Science and Technology inducted Lipscomb into its Academy of Chemical and Biochemical Engineers.

Lipscomb is a fellow of the American Institute of Chemical Engineers, and a 2023 Fellow of the North American Membrane Society.
