= Rakesh Jain =

American cancer researcher

Rakesh K. Jain
- Born: December 18, 1950 (age 75)
- Education: IIT Kanpur (BTech); University of Delaware (MS, PhD)
- Known for: Tumor pathophysiology, Tumor normalization
- Scientific career
- Fields: Chemical engineering
- Institutions: Harvard Medical School, Massachusetts General Hospital
- Doctoral advisor: James Wei
- Other academic advisors: Pietro M. Gullino

Rakesh K. Jain (born 1950) is the Andrew Werk Cook Professor of Tumor Biology director of the E. L. Steele Laboratories at Massachusetts General Hospital in the Harvard Medical School.

== Training and career path ==
Jain received his bachelor's degree in 1972 from IIT Kanpur, and his MS and PhD degrees in 1974 and 1976 from the University of Delaware, all in chemical engineering. He served as assistant professor of chemical engineering at Columbia University (1976 to 1978), and as assistant (1978–79), associate (1979–83) and full professor (1983-1991) of chemical engineering at Carnegie Mellon University. He spent his 1983-84 sabbatical year as a Guggenheim Fellow in the departments of chemical engineering at MIT, bioengineering at UCSD and radiation oncology at Stanford, and his 1990–91 sabbatical as a Humboldt Senior Scientist-Awardee at the Institute of Pathophysiology of University of Mainz, and the Institute of Experimental Surgery of LMU Munich. In 1991, Jain became the Andrew Werk Cook Professor of Radiation Oncology (Tumor Biology) at Harvard Medical School, and Director of Edwin L. Steele Laboratories of Tumor Biology at Massachusetts General Hospital.

== Research ==
Jain is regarded as a pioneer in the area of tumor microenvironment and widely recognized for his seminal discoveries in tumor biology, drug delivery, in vivo imaging, bioengineering, and bench-to-bedside translation. These include uncovering the barriers to the delivery and efficacy of molecular and nano-medicines in tumors, developing new strategies to overcome these barriers, and then translating these strategies from bench to bedside. He is most celebrated for proposing a new principle – normalization of vasculature – for treatment of malignant and non-malignant diseases characterized by abnormal vessels that afflict more than 500 million people worldwide. This concept has fundamentally changed the thinking of scientists and clinicians about how antiangiogenic agents work, and how to combine them optimally with other therapies to improve the treatment outcome in patients.

== Awards and honors ==
He has mentored more than 200 graduate and postdoctoral students from over a dozen different disciplines. Jain's research findings are summarized in more than 600 publications, which have been cited more than 200,000 times (as of November, 2023). He was among the top 1% cited researchers in Clinical Medicine in 2014–15. He serves or has served on advisory panels to government, industry and academia, and is a member of editorial advisory boards of 22 journals, including Nature Reviews Cancer and Nature Reviews Clinical Oncology.

He has received more than 75 awards from engineering and medical professional societies/institutions. He was elected a member of the National Academy of Engineering in 2004 for the integration of bioengineering with tumor biology and imaging gene expression and functions in vivo for drug delivery in tumors. He is also a member of the National Academy of Medicine, the National Academy of Sciences and the American Academy of Arts and Sciences. In 2014, he was chosen as one of 50 Oncology Luminaries on the occasion of the 50th anniversary of the American Society of Clinical Oncology. In 2015, Jain received honorary doctorates from Duke University, KU Leuven, Belgium and IIT-Kanpur, India. In 2013, he was awarded the National Medal of Science.
