= Mosto Bousmina =

Moroccan physicist

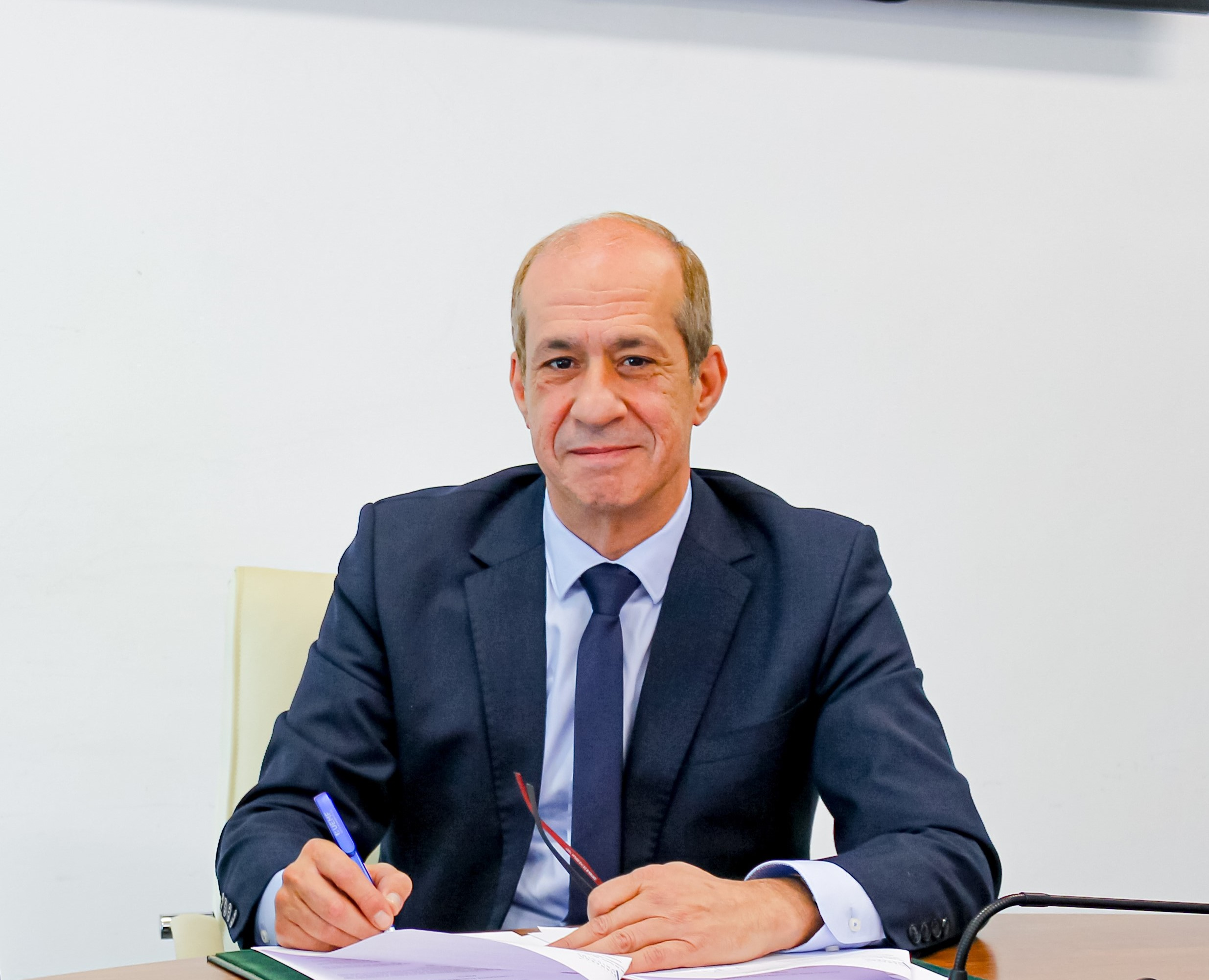
Mostapha Bousmina

Mostapha (Mosto) Bousmina is a Moroccan physical-chemist and rheologist working on nanomaterials and nanotechnology.

Prof. Bousmina is the President of the Euro-Mediterranean University of Morocco in Fez, Chancellor of the Hassan II Academy of Science and Technology-Morocco, and President of the Network of African Academies of Sciences (NASAC).

He is member at large of the Polymer Processing Society, Member of the World Academy of Sciences, and of the African Academy of Sciences.

From to 2008 to 2011, he was the Director General the Institute of Nanomaterials and Nanotechnology (INANOTECH), Morocco. Before that he was Professor and the holder of the Canada Research Chair on Polymer Physics and Nanomaterials at Laval University, Quebec-Canada, vice-President of the Canadian Society of Rheology. He acted also as president of the Quebec Society of Polymers (SQP), Director of SPE (Society of Plastic Engineers: Quebec section), Chair of NSERC evaluation committee (chemical and metallurgical engineering section 4). His important contributions are in physics of polymeric multiphase systems, and nanomaterials.[1]

== Awards ==
- Louis-Pasteur Award, 1993
- Prize of Quebec Minister of Commerce and Industry, 1998
- Morand Lambla Award from the Polymer Processing Society (PPS) "original contribution of a young researcher (under age 39) to the field of polymer processing" in 2000
- Canada Top-Twenty Award, 2002
- NSERC E.W.R. Steacie Memorial Fellowship, 2004.
