= Markus Reiner =

Israeli scientist and engineer

- מרכוס ריינר
- Born: Markus Reiner; 5 January 1886
- Died: 25 April 1976 (aged 90)
- Awards: Weizmann Prize (1955)

Markus Reiner (Hebrew: מרכוס ריינר; born 5 January 1886, died 25 April 1976) was an Israeli scientist and a major figure in rheology.

== Biography ==
Reiner was born 5 January 1886 in Czernowitz, Bukovina, then part of Austria-Hungary, and obtained the degrees of Ingenieur and Doctor of Technology in Civil Engineering at the Technische Hochschule in Vienna (Vienna University of Technology). During the First World War he served as a lieutenant in the Engineering Corps of the Austrian Army. In 1922 he emigrated to Mandatory Palestine, where he was the Chief Civil and Structural Engineer of Public Works in Jerusalem for 25 years under the British mandate. In 1947 he became a professor at the Technion (Israel Institute of Technology) in Haifa. In his honour the Technion later instituted the Markus Reiner Chair in Mechanics and Rheology.

== Personal life ==
In 1923 married Margarete Obernik-Reiner (1893 - 1948) and they had two children, Ephraim and Hana. After her death he married Dr. Rivka Schoenfeld and had two daughters, Dorit and Shlomit. His granddaughter is Prof. Tal Ilan.

== Research ==
Reiner was not only a major figure in rheology, he along with Eugene C. Bingham coined the term and founded a society for its study. As well as the term rheology, and his publications, he is known for the Buckingham-Reiner Equation, the Reiner-Riwlin Equation, and Reiner-Rivlin fluids, the Deborah number and the Teapot effect – an explanation of why tea runs down the outside of the spout of a teapot instead of into the cup.

== Awards ==
- 1958 Israel Prize, in exact science.
- 1966 Gold Medal of the British Society of Rheology

== See also ==
- List of Israel Prize recipients

== Primary source ==
- G. W. Scott-Blair (1976), Rheologica Acta, volume 15 no 7/8, pages 365–266
