= Arthur B. Metzner =

Arthur B. Metzner (13 April 1927 – 4 May 2006) was a Canadian born United States professor of chemical engineering and noted rheologist.

== Life ==
Metzner was born 13 April 1927 in Gravelbourg, Saskatchewan and grew up in Barrhead, Alberta. He gained a B.S. degree in chemical engineering from the University of Alberta in 1948 and a doctorate Sc.D from Massachusetts Institute of Technology (MIT) in 1951. He joined the faculty of University of Delaware in 1953 and remained there until his retirement in 1993. He became a full professor in 1961, and in 1991 the H. Fletcher Brown Professor of Chemical Engineering, which title he held emeritus until his death. He died on 4 May 2006, survived by his wife, Elisabeth.

== Work ==
Metzner realised that conventional theories of heat and mass transfer were very poor in designing many industrial processes with non-Newtonian fluids, and set about producing new design methods. His work had direct industrial relevance to the processing of composite materials, polymer processing, and fiber spinning. His studies of fluid mechanics produced the Otto-Metzner correlation for power consumption in mixing of non-Newtonian fluids and the White-Metzner equation for stress which is used in computational fluid dynamics for polymer processing. He was also renowned as an educator.

== Honours and awards ==
Metzner was a member of the National Academy of Engineering and received awards from the American Institute of Chemical Engineers, the American Society for Engineering Education, the American Chemical Society and in 1977 the Bingham Medal from the Society of Rheology.
