= Matthias Ballauff =

German chemist and physicist

- Born: 13 July 1952 (age 74)
- Education: University of Mainz
- Scientific career
- Fields: Physics, Chemistry
- Workplaces: Free University of Berlin; Humboldt University Berlin; Helmholtz-Zentrum Berlin; University of Bayreuth; Karlsruhe Institute of Technology; Stanford University; Max Planck Institute for Polymer Research; University of Mainz
- Thesis: (1981)
- Doctoral advisor: Bernhard A. Wolf
- Other academic advisors: Paul Flory

Matthias Ballauff (born 13 July 1952) is a German chemist and physicist, and is a professor of physics at the Free University of Berlin. His postdoctoral research and training was directed by Paul Flory. He contributed to various areas of physical chemistry, in particular to polymer science, colloidal chemistry and nanomaterials, as well as to soft matter physics. Ballauff is particularly known for having developed new catalyst materials in the form of functionalized metallic nanoparticles dispersed in liquid phase, which can greatly speed up the reaction kinetics of organic molecules.

== Selected publications ==
- Wunder, S.; Polzer, F.; Lu, Y.; Mei, Y.; Ballauff, M. (2010), "Kinetic analysis of catalytic reduction of 4-nitrophenol by metallic nanoparticles immobilized in spherical polyelectrolyte brushes", Journal of Physical Chemistry C, 114 (19): 8814–8820, doi:10.1021/jp101125j.
- Gu, S.; Wunder, S.; Lu, Y.; Ballauff, M.; Fenger, R.; Rademann, K.; Jaquet, B.; Zaccone, A. (2014), "Kinetic Analysis of the Catalytic Reduction of 4-Nitrophenol by Metallic Nanoparticles", Journal of Physical Chemistry C, 118 (32): 18618–18625, doi:10.1021/jp5060606.
- Guo, X.; Weiss, A.; Ballauff, M. (1999). "Synthesis of Spherical Polyelectrolyte Brushes by Photoemulsion Polymerization". Macromolecules. 32 (19). American Chemical Society (ACS): 6043–6046. Bibcode:1999MaMol..32.6043G. doi:10.1021/ma990609o. ISSN 0024-9297.
