= Lynching of Fred Rouse =

1921 Texas lynching

- Part of Jim Crow Era
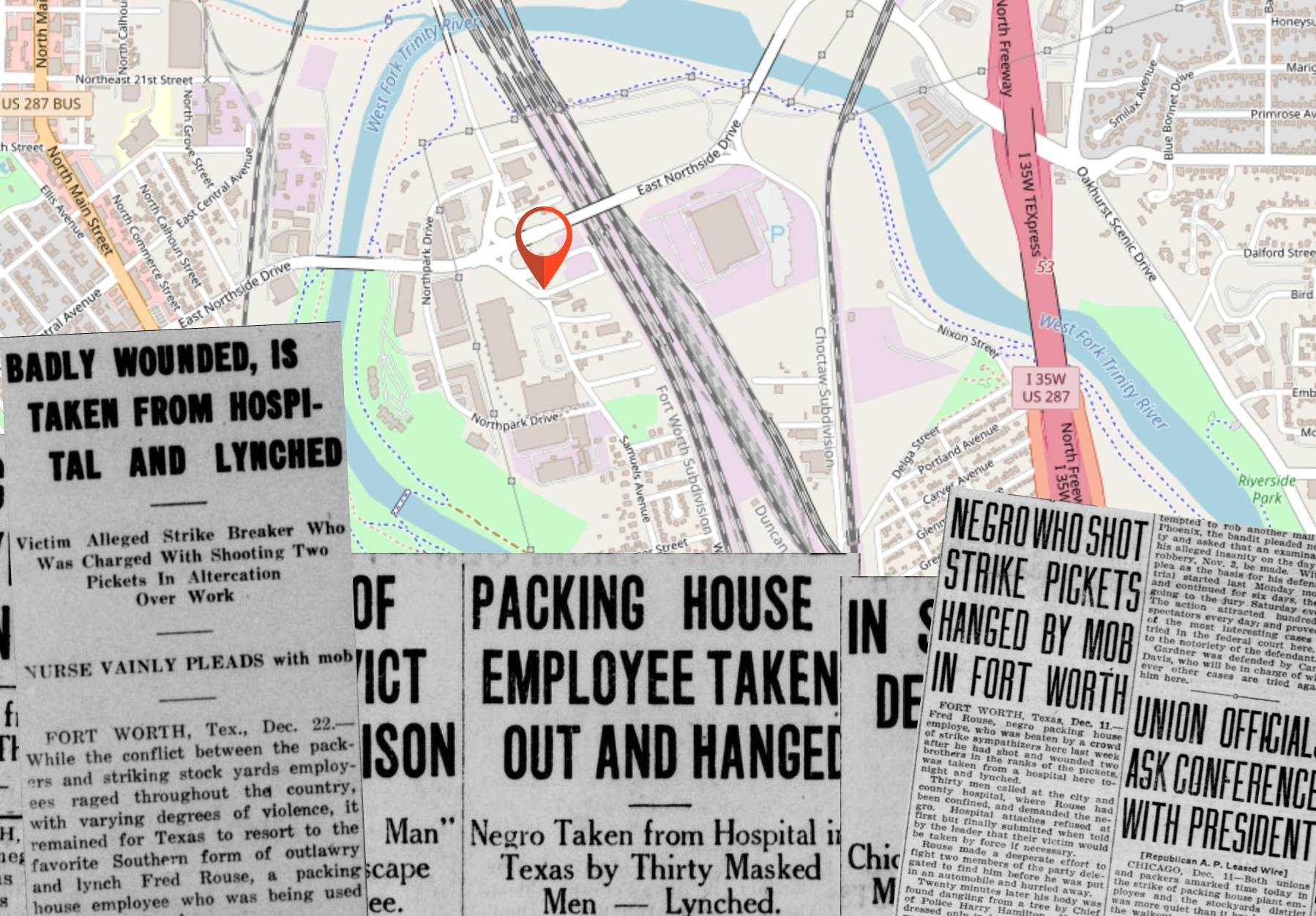
- Approximate location of the hanging of Fred Rouse
- Date: December 11, 1921
- Location: Hanged on a tree at the corner of NE 12th Street and Samuels Avenue in Fort Worth, Texas, Tarrant County, Texas
- Participants: A white mob of 30 people storm hospital to lynch Rouse
- Deaths: 1

53-year-old meatpacker Fred Rouse was lynched on December 11, 1921, in Fort Worth, Texas.

== Background ==
In 1921, the whites-only union workers at the Swift & Co. meatpacking plant in the Niles City Stockyards (now part of Fort Worth) went on strike. The owners attempted to replace them with black strikebreakers. During union protests, African-American worker Fred Rouse was accosted by some of the strikers, and he was stabbed in the back with a knife. This resulted in Rouse firing his gun, wounding two white strikers who happened to be brothers. At this point, Rouse was clobbered, disarmed, and taken into custody by a Niles City policeman. Once Rouse was disarmed, the mob pried Rouse away from the policeman. Rouse attempted to escape, but was refused entrance onto a streetcar. The mob then beat Rouse into "insensibility," and when he appeared to have perished, the mob allowed the police to recover Rouse's body and place it in a police wagon. The wagon made its way toward the morgue, but Rouse miraculously regained consciousness and was taken to the "Negro Ward" at the City & County Hospital (330 E. 4th St.).

== Lynching ==
Rouse spent several days recovering in the segregated ward, which was located in the basement. Unfortunately, local media reported on Rouse's condition and whereabouts. At 11pm on Sunday, December 11, a mob of about 25 men boldly entered the City & County Hospital demanding Rouse be released to them. Neither the nurse, nor the superintending doctor on duty were able to persuade the mob to disperse. Eventually, Rouse was dragged out of the hospital in his nightgown. He was strung up on a tree at the corner of NE 12th Street and Samuels Avenue in Fort Worth, Texas. The white mob took turns riddling his body with gunshots.

== Aftermath ==
The strikers' union officially disavowed the lynching, but there is evidence of members' participation. Members of the union and the Niles City Police force perpetrated this lynching. In the immediate aftermath of Rouse's initial assault by packinghouse picketers, the Niles City Police Chief Frank Averitt blamed the entire incident on Rouse. The Niles City police force was also unionized, and Averitt and his men likely loathed Rouse for crossing the picket line. Six suspected members of the lynch mob were later indicted, including 2 Niles City policemen, but they never went to trial.

On Saturday, December 11, 2021, at the corner of NE 12th and Samuels, the Tarrant County Coalition for Peace and Justice (TCCPJ), a nonprofit affiliated with the Equal Justice Initiative and dedicated to memorializing victims of racial violence, erected a historical marker honoring the life and sacrifice of Fred Rouse. The organization plans to develop the surrounding land into a memorial dedicated to peace and justice.

== Bibliography ==
Notes
