= Organoclay =

Organically modified phyllosilicate

Organoclay is an organically modified phyllosilicate, derived from a naturally occurring clay mineral. By exchanging the original interlayer cations for organocations (typically quaternary alkylammonium ions) an organophilic surface is generated, consisting of covalently linked organic moieties. The lamellar structure remains analogous to the parent phyllosilicate.

== Nanocomposites ==
Separation of the layers due to ion exchange, from the initial interlayer spacing of as little as 3 Å in the case of Na+ cations to the distances in the range of 10–40 Å as well as the change of chemical character of the clay surface, allows the in-situ polymerization or mixing with certain polymers to obtain what is known as nanocomposite.

When ordered aluminosilicate sheets are lying parallel to each other, separated with polymer chains of certain type, the system is classified as intercalated nanocomposite.

If separation of the layers is so significant, that they are no longer lying opposite to one another, but randomly ordered, then one get the exfoliated nanocomposite.

== Applications ==
Owing to its large surface area together with hydrophobic chains emerging from the clay surface, organoclay can be used to remove oil from water. It is also applied as a component in paint formulations or as a viscosifier for oil-based drilling fluids.

It can be used in polymer chemistry as a nucleating agent.

== See also ==
- Pentagonite
