= Christopher Macosko =

American chemical engineer

Christopher Ward Macosko
- Born: June 14, 1944 (age 82); United States
- Education: Carnegie-Mellon University; Imperial College, London; Princeton University
- Known for: Polymer Rheology; Melt Processing; Nanocomposites
- Awards: Charles A. Stine Award, 1988; Pall Award, 1997; National Academy of Engineering (2001); Bingham Medal, 2004; Charles Goodyear Medal, 2023
- Scientific career
- Fields: Chemical Engineer, Materials Science
- Workplaces: University of Minnesota
- Doctoral advisor: Bryce Maxwell

External videos
- “CEMS UMN - Chris Macosko's "Last Lecture"” “Analyzing Molecular Weight Distribution w/ Rheology”

Christopher Ward Macosko (1944) is an American chemical engineer and professor emeritus in the department of chemical engineering and materials science at the University of Minnesota. He is internationally known for his work in polymer science and engineering, especially in the areas of rheology and polymer processing. Macosko is an author of more than 500 academic papers, dozens of patents, and two books including the text: "Rheology: Principles, Measurements and Applications" (Wiley/VCH, 1994). He served as director of the Industrial Partnership for Research in Interfacial and Materials Engineering (IPRIME), a university-industry consortium at the University of Minnesota, from 1999 to 2018. Macosko and his wife Kathleen have been married since 1967 and are long-time residents of Minneapolis. They have four children and 12 grandchildren.

== Early life and education ==
Macosko received a B.S. degree in chemical engineering in 1966 from Carnegie-Mellon University. He then spent one year at Imperial College, London and obtained an M.S. degree in chemical engineering in 1967. Macosko earned his Ph.D. degree in chemical engineering in 1970 from Princeton University, where he worked under the supervision of Bryce Maxwell. His thesis work included the design of a new less-compliant rheometer. Macosko and a fellow graduate student, Joe Starita, co-founded the company Rheometrics, whose instruments have significantly advanced the field of rheology. The company is now part of TA Instruments, a world-leading manufacturer of rheological devices.

== Research at Minnesota ==
In 1970, Macosko joined the University of Minnesota and become one of the first assistant professors in the then newly combined department of chemical engineering and materials science. His research on polymers served as a bridge between the two disciplines, and his leadership helped attract other faculty in this area and contributed to the international reputation in polymers at the University of Minnesota. Macosko's research was centered around polymer processing, with special emphasis on the structure-function relation between polymer morphology and the associated rheological, mechanical, electronic, and other physical properties. He made significant contributions toward understanding the rheology of polymer materials, such as the characterization of network formation during gelation, the elasticity of foams, interfacial area generation in reactive blends, and the viscoelastic character of polymer composites. Macosko's research has addressed a broad range of polymer processing operations including reaction injection molding, extrusion, melt blowing, and coating. His current research interests include network polymerization, nanoparticle reinforced polymer composites, interfacial reaction during polymer blending, and polymerization with phase separation. Macosko has taught short courses for many years on rheological measurements that have attracted industrial interest.

== Awards, honors, and professional service ==
As of December 2017, Macosko has graduated over 100 Ph.D. students, and has supervised more than 50 postdoctoral researchers. Many of his students and postdocs have become faculty members at major research universities across the world (e.g., Julio Ottino at Northwestern University). Macosko was elected a member of the National Academy of Engineering in 2001 for the invention, development, and dissemination of new methods of reactive polymer processing and rheological property measurement. He was elected a fellow of the American Physical Society in 2007 for "pioneering work on the rheology, compatibilization, processing, and properties of polymer blends." He was awarded the Bingham Medal by the Society of Rheology in 2004. He has also received Charles M. A. Stine Award (now called the Braskem Award) in Materials Engineering and Sciences from American Institute of Chemical Engineers in 1988 at Northwestern University. In addition, Macosko has received numerous awards including the Pall Award for Applied Polymer Research in 1997, the Banbury Award from American Chemical Society in 2006, the International Award from the Society of Polymer Science Japan (SPSJ) in 2008, and the Lifetime Achievement Award from the International Conference on Advanced Molding Technology and Materials Processing in 2012. He received the Charles Goodyear Medal from the ACS Rubber Division in 2023. He is ranked by Academic Influence as among the thirty most influential chemical engineers in the United States.

== Works ==
Chris Macosko has authored numerous journal articles describing significant advances in polymer rheology, melt processing, and nanocomposites which includes but is not limited to:

- C.W. Macosko, D.R. Miller "A new derivation of postgel properties of network polymers", Rubber Chemistry and Technology, 49(5), 1219-1231, (1976).
- C.W. Macosko, D.R. Miller "A new derivation of average molecular weights of nonlinear polymers", Macromolecules, 9(2), 199-206, (1976).
- A.C. Papanastasiou, L.E. Scriven, C.W. Macosko "An Integral Constitutive Equation for Mixed Flows: Viscoelastic Characterization", Journal of Rheology, 27(4), 387-410, (1983).
- D.E. Bornside, C.W. Macosko, L.E. Scriven "Spin Coating: One-dimensional Model", Journal of Applied Physics, 66(11), 5185-5193, (1989).
- U. Sundararaj, C.W. Macosko "Drop breakup andcoalescence in polymer blends: the effects of concentration and compatibilization", Macromolecules, 38(8), 2647-2657, (1995).
- X. Cao, L.J. Lee, T. Widya, C.W. Macosko "Polyurethane/clay nanocomposite foams: processing, structure and properties", Polymer, 46(3), 775-783, (2005).
- C.J. Ellison, A. Phatak, D.W. Giles, C.W. Macosko, F.S.Bates "Melt blown nanofibers: fiber diameter distributions and onset of fiber breakup", Polymer, 48(11), 3306-3316, (2007).
- H. Kim, A.A. Abdala, C.W. Macosko "Graphene/Polymer Nanocomposites", Macromolecules, 43(16), 6515-6530, (2010).

Chris was also the author of two highly influential books:

- C.W. Macosko "Rheology: Principles, Measurements and Applications", 1st Edition 1994, Wiley-VCH. ISBN 978-0471185758
- C.W. Macosko "RIM Fundamentals of Reaction Injection Molding", 1st Edition 1989, Hanser Publishing ISBN 978-1569900550
