= Rouse model =

Idealised bead–spring model of polymer dynamics

Schematic representation of the bead–spring chain used in the Rouse model (N = 13 beads; mean bond length l).

The Rouse model is one of the simplest coarse-grained descriptions of the dynamics of polymer chains. It treats a single polymer as an ideal chain of N point-like beads connected by harmonic springs and neglects both excluded volume and long-range hydrodynamic interactions. Each bead experiences random thermal forces and a Stokes drag, so the chain undergoes overdamped Brownian motion described by Langevin dynamics. Although first proposed for dilute solutions, the model also describes polymer melts whose chain length is below the entanglement threshold.

== Description ==
A flexible polymer is represented by an ideal freely jointed chain of beads with mean bond length l. Neglecting inertia, the overdamped equation of motion for the position $\mathbf{R}_n(t)$ of bead n is

$$\frac{\mathrm{d}\vec{R}_n}{\mathrm{d}t}=\underbrace{\frac{k}{\zeta}\cdot\left(\vec{R}_{n-1}-\vec{R}_n+\vec{R}_{n+1}-\vec{R}_n\right)}_{\text{Neighbor interaction}}+\underbrace{\vec{f}_n(t)}_{\text{random force}}$$

where k is the spring constant, $\zeta$ the one-bead friction coefficient and random force $\mathbf f_n(t)$ a zero-mean Gaussian noise that fulfills the fluctuation–dissipation theorem. At either chain end the missing neighbor term is omitted.

=== Key dynamical properties ===
Solving the coupled stochastic equations yields several characteristic quantities:

- Centre-of-mass diffusion coefficient: $D_\text{G}= \frac{k_\mathrm{B} T}{N\zeta}$, where $k_\mathrm{B}$ is the Boltzmann constant, $T$ is the absolute temperature, and $N$ denotes the total number of beads (or Kuhn segments) that make up the ideal freely-jointed chain.
- Longest (rotational) Rouse relaxation time: $\tau_\text{R} = \frac{\zeta N^{2} l^{2}}{3\pi^{2}k_\mathrm{B} T}$, where $l$ is the mean bond length.
- Single-segment mean-squared displacement (MSD) for lag time τ ($\tau\ll\tau_\text{R}$) $\langle\Delta R_n^{2}(\tau)\rangle \simeq \frac{2Nl^{2}}{\pi^{3/2}}\sqrt{\frac{\tau}{\tau_\text{R}}}$

This subdiffusive behavior with $\tau^{1/2}$ time dependence is characteristic of Rouse dynamics and distinguishes polymer motion from simple Brownian diffusion.

== Extension: The Zimm model ==
Hydrodynamic interaction: a force F_{n} (red) acts on segment n. This produces a local flow (green) that in turn affects neighbouring segments (forces shown as small black arrows).

A significant extension was published in 1956 by Bruno Zimm: His model (often referred to simply as the "Zimm model") also takes into account *hydrodynamic interactions* between the beads of the chain. These interactions are forces mediated by the surrounding solvent molecules: when a bead moves, it drags solvent molecules along, which in turn exert a force on adjacent beads (see figure). Because of this additional coupling, the Zimm model gives a more realistic description of polymers in dilute solution than the Rouse model and agrees with experimental data for certain dilute-solution polymers.

The Langevin equation of the Rouse model is extended by a tensor (matrix) $\mathrm{H}_{nm}$, which represents the hydrodynamic force between the $n$-th and $m$-th segments:

$$\frac{\mathrm{d}\vec{R}_n}{\mathrm{d}t}=\underbrace{k\cdot\sum\limits_{m}\mathrm{H}_{nm}\left(\vec{R}_{n-1}-\vec{R}_n+\vec{R}_{n+1}-\vec{R}_n\right)}_{\text{Neighbor interaction + hydrodynamics}}+\underbrace{\vec{f}_n(t)}_{\text{random force}}$$

Here the tensor $\mathrm{H}_{nm}$ depends on the positions $\vec{R}_{0},\dots ,\vec{R}_{N-1}$ of all segments. Consequently, the equation is nonlinear and cannot be solved analytically. Zimm therefore replaced $\mathrm{H}_{nm}(\vec{R}_{0},\dots ,\vec{R}_{N-1})$ by its equilibrium average $\langle\mathrm{H}_{nm}\rangle_{\text{eq}}$, which can be evaluated. From this approximation the following properties of a Zimm polymer are obtained:

- Diffusion coefficient of the centre of mass: $D_{G}=\frac{8k_{\mathrm{B}}T}{3\sqrt{6\pi^{3}}\,\eta_{s}\sqrt{N}\,l}$, where $\eta_{s}$ is the solvent viscosity.
- Rotational relaxation time: $\tau_{R}=\frac{\eta_{s}(\sqrt{N}\,l)^{3}}{\sqrt{3\pi}\,k_{\mathrm{B}}T}$.
- Mean-square displacement of a single segment: $\bigl\langle|\vec{R}_{n}(\tau)|^{2}\bigr\rangle=\frac{2\Gamma(1/3)\,N\,l^{2}}{\pi^{2}}\!\left(\frac{\tau}{\tau_{R}}\right)^{2/3}$, where $\Gamma$ represents the Gamma function.

== See also ==
- Oldroyd-B model
- Polymer
- Reptation
