= Arthur V. Tobolsky =

American chemistry professor

Arthur Victor Tobolsky (1919–1972) was a professor in the chemistry department at Princeton University known for teaching and research in polymer science and rheology.

== Biography ==
Arthur Tobolsky was born in New York City in 1919.He graduated from Columbia in 1940, and received his PhD from Princeton in 1944. He studied under Henry Eyring and Hugh Stott Taylor.

Tobolsky died unexpectedly at the age of 53 on September 7, 1972, while attending a conference in Utica, N.Y.

== Scientific and academic career ==
Early in his career, he spent one year at the Brooklyn Polytechnic Institute. After that, he spent his entire career in the Chemistry Department at Princeton. He served on the Editorial Boards of American Scientist, the Journal of Polymer Science, and the Journal of Applied Physics. In 1966, Tobolsky was a Fellow of the American Physical Society. His most cited work proposed a molecular theory of relaxing media.
