= William B. Russel =

American chemical engineer

William Bailey Russel (November 7, 1945 – September 24, 2023) was an American chemical engineer, Arthur W. Marks '19 Professor of Chemical Engineering, emeritus, and dean emeritus of the graduate school at Princeton University. He earned his BA and MChE degrees at Rice University in 1969 and his PhD at Stanford University in 1973. He was a NATO Postdoctoral Fellow at Cambridge University in 1974.

Russel was known for his significant contribution to the study of surface and colloid chemistry, and was published widely in these scientific fields.

Russel joined the faculty of Princeton University in 1974 as an assistant professor. He was the director of the Princeton Materials Institute. He served as the dean of the graduate school of Princeton University for 12 years before retiring in 2014.

In 1993, he was elected a member of the National Academy of Engineering for research on the influence of polymers on the phase behavior, coagulation, and rheology of colloidal dispersions. He was also a member of the American Academy of Arts and Sciences.

He was awarded the Bingham Medal in 1999 by the Society of Rheology.
