= Society of Rheology =

American professional organization

- Formation: 1929
- Type: Professional association
- Location: USA
- Members: 1700
- Official language: English
- President: Michael Graham
- Website: www.rheology.org

The Society of Rheology is an American professional society formed in December, 1929 to represent scientists and technologists working in the field of rheology, the science of the deformation and flow of matter.

Current membership is of the order of 1700 and meetings are held at least annually to discuss topics of common interest. The Society publishes scientific and technical papers in the field of rheology in its own Journal of Rheology and presents a number of annual awards to acknowledge and encourage successful research.

The society was one of the founding members of the American Institute of Physics and is also a member of the International Committee on Rheology, which organizes an international congress on the subject every four years.

== Publications ==
The Journal of Rheology is published every two months for the society by the American Institute of Physics and includes papers on the subject of rheology. It was initially established in 1957 as an annual publication entitled the Transactions of The Society of Rheology.

The Rheology Bulletin is published twice a year as a news bulletin.

== Awards ==
The Bingham Medal is awarded annually to an individual who has made an outstanding contribution to the science of rheology.

The Arthur B. Metzner Early Career Award is awarded, at most annually, to a young person who has distinguished him/herself in rheological research, rheological practice, or service to rheology.

The Distinguished Service Award is awarded infrequently, at the discretion of the Executive Committee, to recognize exceptional service to the Society.
