= James Busfield =

Academic

James Busfield is a Queen Mary University of London professor, and head of the United Kingdom's largest research group in the area of Soft Matter.

== Education ==
Busfield completed an MA in Engineering Science at the University of Oxford in 1989. In 2000, he completed a doctoral degree in materials science at Queen Mary University of London under advisor Alan G. Thomas. He made influential studies of ceramic foams and of the electrical and mechanical behavior of filled rubbers. He has chaired the 2003 European Conference on Constitutive Models for Rubber, together with Alan Muhr.

== Awards and recognition ==
- 2009 - National Teaching Fellowship
- 2009 - Colwyn Medal from the IOM3
- 2010 - Sparks–Thomas award from the ACS Rubber Division
- 2020 - Fellow of the Royal Academy of Engineering
- 2021 - George Stafford Whitby Award by the ACS Rubber Division

== Notable students ==
- Lewis Tunnicliffe
