= Lewis Tunnicliffe =

British-American Materials Scientist

Lewis Tunnicliffe is an Atlanta-based product design and development manager at Birla Carbon, who has been recognized internationally for his scientific research in the area of carbon black filler applications to elastomers.

== Early life ==
Tunnicliffe is originally from the West Midlands in Staffordshire, England and grew up in the small village of Haughton.

== Education ==
Tunnicliffe earned a BS in chemistry at the University of Durham in 2005. He then worked in industry for three years, returning to graduate school and completing a Ph.D. in 2015 at Queen Mary University of London under advisors James Busfield and Alan G. Thomas.

== Career ==
Tunnicliffe's first position following his undergraduate degree was with Sibelco Europe as a research scientist. He joined Birla Carbon in February 2016 as a materials scientist. He currently heads a product design and development group at Birla. Tunnicliffe won a grant from USDA to investigate the application of cellulose nanoparticles in tires.

His most cited academic work produced a method for simultaneous dielectric/dynamic mechanical characterization of a filled elastomer. The technique produces information about the presence of dipoles on the polymer-filler interface, useful in understanding origins of the Mullins and Payne effects. He has also characterized the size distribution of crack precursors in carbon black filled rubber.

== Awards and recognition ==
- 2011 - James S. Walker award from Institute of Materials, Minerals and Mining
- 2013 - Best Young Scientist award from Tire Technology International.
- 2023 - Sparks–Thomas award from the ACS Rubber Division.
