= Hollerith Electronic Computer =

Early British computer for businesss

Hollerith Electronic Computer (HEC)
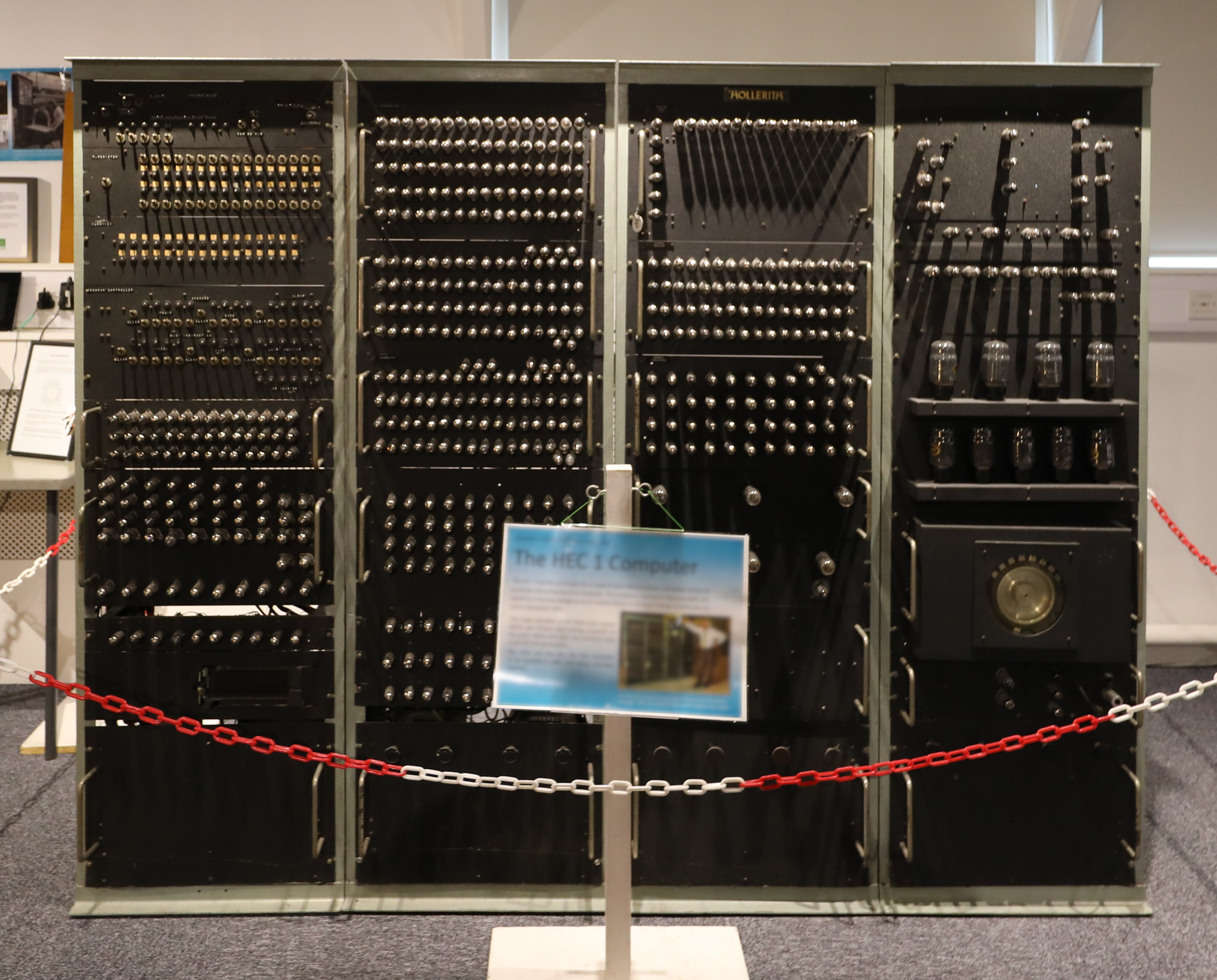
- Hollerith Electronic Computer 1 at the National Museum of Computing
- Developer: Andrew Booth
- Manufacturer: British Tabulating Machine Company (BTM)
- Released: 1951; 75 years ago
- Dimensions: 1.5 m high by 3m wide by 0.5m deep

The Hollerith Electronic Computer (HEC) was produced by the British Tabulating Machine Company (BTM) and was based on a design by Professor Andrew Booth of Birkbeck College, London. It was Britain's first mass-produced business computer. The prototype first worked at the end of 1951.

== Origins ==
In 1950 John Womersley, who had previously led the team developing the Automatic Computing Engine (ACE) at the National Physical Laboratory (NPL), joined BTM, a unit record equipment company. He recognised that there was a need for smaller inexpensive computers and recruited Andrew Booth as a consultant to develop such a machine. Booth had previously worked for the British Rayon Research Association (BRRA) before moving to Birkbeck College in 1945. The BRRA had sponsored him to develop what became the All Purpose Electronic Computer (APEXC). He needed punched card input and output technologies and struck a deal with BTM, whereby they supplied him with these in return for their copying the machine that he was developing, including its magnetic drum memory. In March 1951, BTM's Dr Raymond 'Dickie' Bird with Bill Davis and Dickie Cox were dispatched to Fenny Compton in Warwickshire where Booth lived and where, in a rotting barn, he was developing the prototype of his machine.

== Development ==
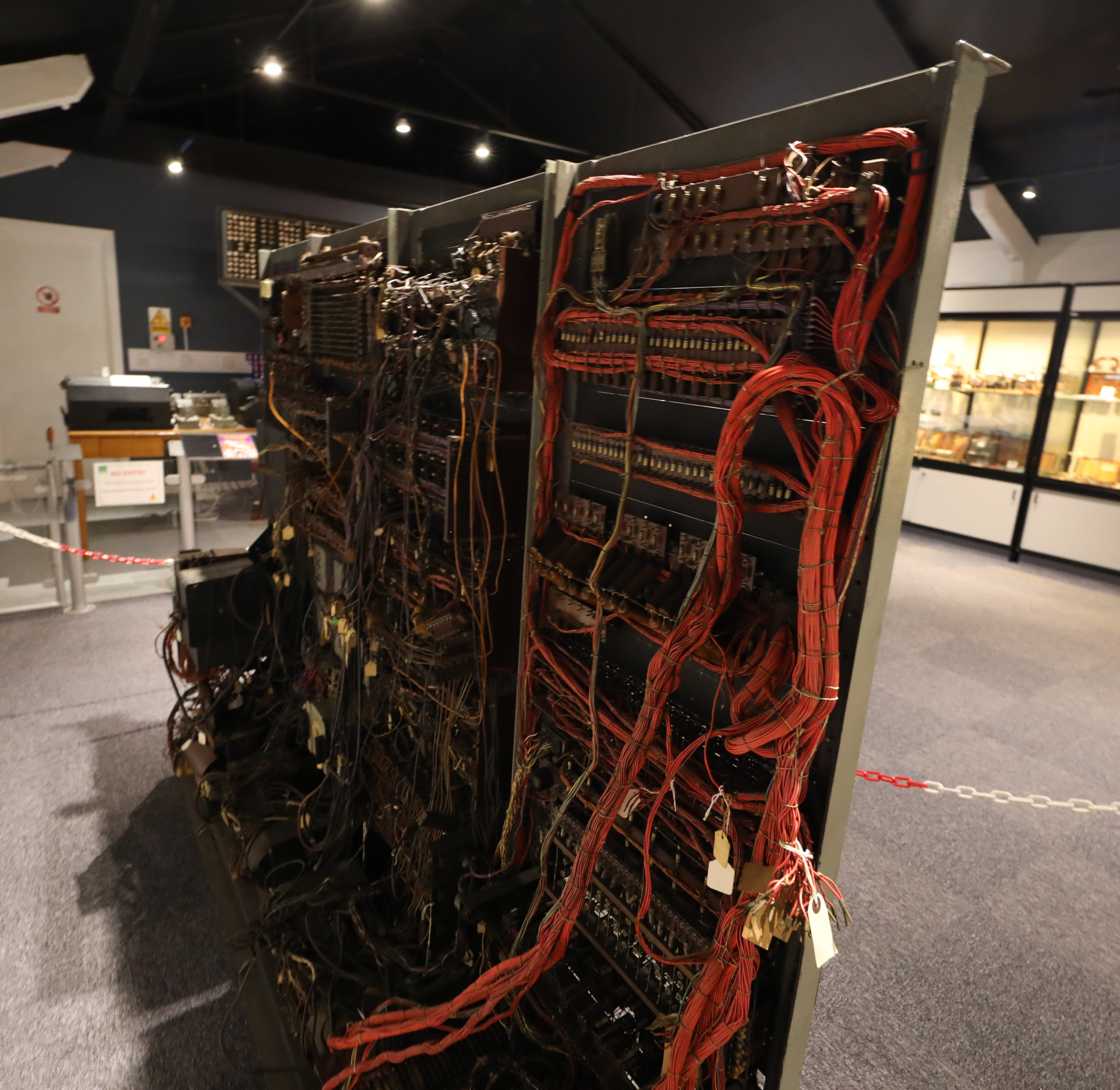
The wiring on the rear of the computer in October 2018

Dr Bird and his team built a copy of Booth's machine in the BTM premises at Icknield Way Letchworth, which they called HEC 1. It was 1.5 m high by 3m wide by 0.5m deep and used simple circuits, with approximately 1000 ex-government thermionic valves (vacuum tubes) mainly 6J6s which were B7G-based double triodes. The memory consisted of a 5.5 inches (140 mm) diameter, 1 inch (25 mm) wide drum rotating at 3000 rpm containing 32 tracks each storing sixteen 32-bit words giving a total of 2 kilobytes. The drum had a special track from which the electronics were clocked. The machine had an accumulator and a multiplier register which were arranged to allow double-length multiplication. As the multiplicand was repeatedly added to the product, it got longer while the multiplier got shorter so that the product could fill the accumulator and then continue into the multiplier register. Multiplication took up to 640ms for a 32-bit multiplier, which needed 32 drum accesses.

Subsequently, the design was enhanced with larger capacity drums. A pre-production HEC 2 was exhibited at the Business Efficiency Exhibition at Olympia, London in June 1953 and in 1955, the first production machine called HEC 2M was delivered. Seven or eight HEC 2M systems were delivered to customers who included GE Research Laboratories, Thorn, Esso, MoD Boscombe Down, Royal Aircraft Establishment and RAE, Bedford (they had two for wind tunnel applications) and the Indian Mathematical Institute.

The next development was of a machine that was essentially a HEC 2 with a number of enhancements specifically designed for a commercial workload. This became known as the HEC 4. When in 1959 International Computers and Tabulators (ICT) was formed by a merger of the BTM and Powers-Samas, the HEC 4 became the ICT 1201 (1200 series). Some 100 of these machines were sold.

== Preservation ==
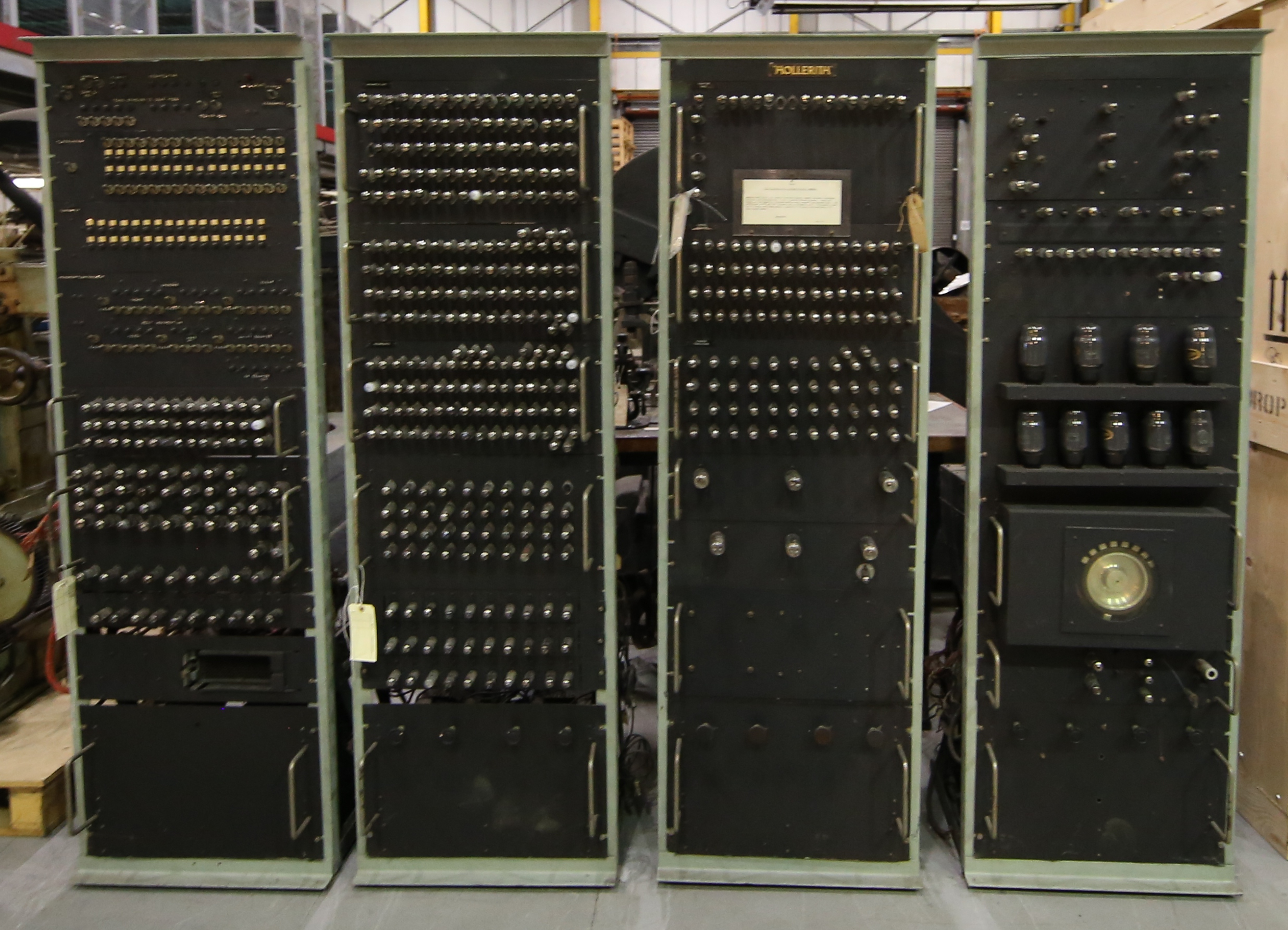
The Hollerith Electronic Computer 1 computer in the Birmingham Museum Collection centre

The original HEC 1 appears to have spent some time in the ICL company museum before being transferred to the collection of Birmingham museums in 1972. After some time on display, it was by 2002 in the Birmingham Museum Collection Centre at which point there was a proposal to lend it to Birkbeck College but this fell through.

The National Museum of Computing made an approach to borrow the computer in 2014 and the computer was transferred on 12 October 2015. After being cleaned up it was officially unveiled in the presence of Dr Bird in April 2016.

== Sources ==
- Bird, Raymond 'Dickie' (Summer 1999), "BTM's First Steps into Computing", Resurrection: The Bulletin of the Computer Conservation Society, 22, ISSN 0958-7403
- Fleming, Stephen (4 April 2016), Britain's first mass-produced business computer, The National Museum of Computing
