= Alan H. Muhr =

English scientist

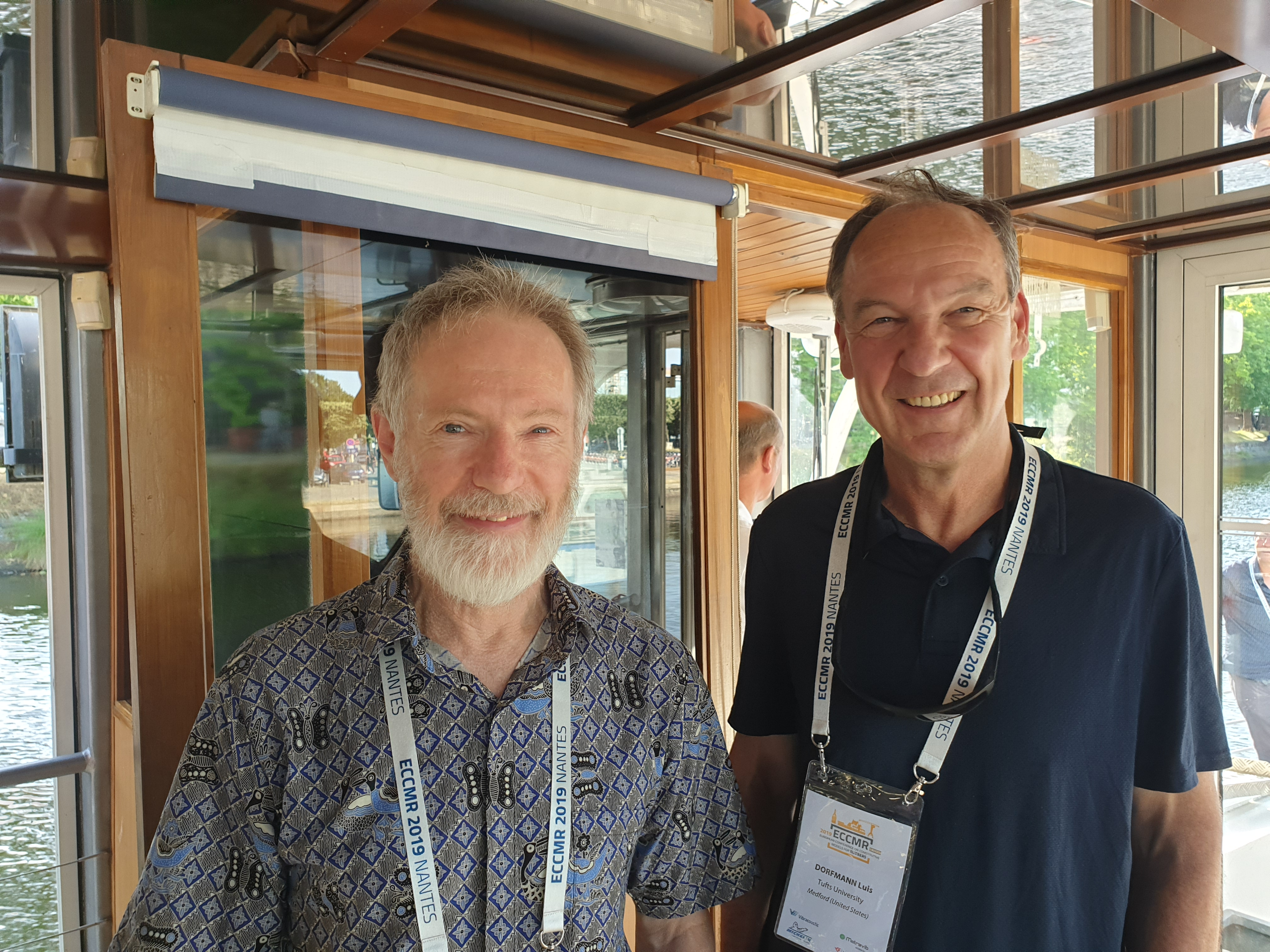
Alan Muhr and Luis Dorfmann, founders of ECCMR in 2019 at Nantes, France

Alan Hugh Muhr is a retired TARRC scientist noted for contributions to understanding the mechanics elastomer applications, including laminated rubber isolators, marine fenders, automotive mounts, and structural energy dissipation systems

== Education ==
Muhr graduated in 1975 with an undergraduate degree in mathematics from the University of Cambridge. He completed his PhD and post-doctoral research at the University of Nottingham on the rheology, thermodynamics and crystallization of polysaccharides.

== Career ==
Muhr joined TARRC in 1983, known at the time as the Malaysian Rubber Producers' Research Association. He was recruited by Alan G. Thomas to work on the abrasion of rubber and its relationship to crack-growth characteristics. He later became an authority on the mechanics of flexible rubber-steel laminates and seismic isolaters. In 1999, he was promoted to Leader of the Engineering Research & Design Unit. His most cited work in the rubber field is a review on modeling stress-strain behavior. Muhr organized a 2005 symposium celebrating the 50th anniversary of Rivlin and Thomas' seminar work on fracture mechanics in rubber, and he co-founded the biennial European Conference on Constitutive Models for Rubber.

== Awards ==
- 2015 - Melvin Mooney Distinguished Technology Award from Rubber Division of the ACS
- 2018 - Hancock Medal from the Institute of Materials, Minerals and Mining
