= Julie Diani =

French academic in the field of mechanics of polymeric materials

Julie Diani is a French academic specialised in the characterization and simulation of polymeric materials. She is the CNRS Research Director at École Polytechnique’s Solid Mechanics Laboratory, and holder of the Arkema Design and Modeling of Innovative Materials Chair.

== Education ==
Diani earned a B.S. in Applied Mathematics and her S.M. Degree in Mechanical Engineering at the Pierre et Marie Curie University. She completed her doctoral degree in Materials Science and Engineering at Ecole Normale Superieure de Cachan.

== Career ==
She joined CNRS in 2000. From 2004 to 2006, she was a visiting researcher at the University of Colorado, Boulder.

Diani's most cited works include a review of the Mullins effect and a constitutive model for Shape-memory polymers.

== Personal life ==
Diani is the daughter of two math teachers, and she does Judo and biking.

== Awards and recognition ==
- 2015 - Sparks–Thomas award from the ACS Rubber Division
