= Wool Industries Research Association =

Wool research organisation in the UK

- Formation: 1918; 108 years ago
- Purpose: Research association for the wood industry
- Location: Torridon, United Kingdom
- Region served: Worldwide

The Wool Industries Research Association (WIRA) was an industrial research organization in the United Kingdom. In addition to conducting research in support of the wool and textile industries, WIRA undertook certification activities as well.

Established as the British Research Association for the Woollen and Worsted Industries in 1918 to promote industry-wide cooperation on research matters, it quickly garnered support from various educational establishments, the Department of Scientific and Industrial Research (DSIT), and the wool industry itself. It performed numerous research projects, including several of national importance, such as anti-chemical warfare apparatus during the Second World War. Perhaps the most high-profile breakthrough, performed by Archer J.P. Martin and Richard L.M. Synge, was partition chromatography, for which both Martin and Synge received the 1952 Nobel Prize in Chemistry.

During the late 1940s, WIRA's Torridon facility was expanded considerably under the stewardship of B. H. Wilsdon, its director. During the postwar era, it was rebranded as Wira Technology Group. In 1989, WIRA merged with the Shirley Institute to form the British Textile Technology Group (BTTG).

== History ==
It was originally founded in 1918 as the British Research Association for the Woollen and Worsted Industries with the purpose of promoting collaboration between wool-using companies through the operation of a nation-wide research programme into the various issues and questions faced across the sector. Its formation had been supported by numerous educational institutions, including Leeds University and Bradford Technical College. Its creation came around the same time as Parliament approval of a £1 million fund to support industrial research and a corresponding scheme for the establishment of research associations connected with various industries, which typically each received a grant for five years on a fifty-fifty basis towards their expenses.

For much of its existence, funding for WIRA principally came from a levy that had been raised under powers from the Industrial Organisation and Development Act 1947 through the Wool Textile Research Council; additionally, the Department of Scientific and Industrial Research (DSIT) would provide a grant, although this was conditional on that the industry itself contribute reasonable funding levels as well. Between 1918 and 1964, the combined value of DSIT grants to WIRA was £1,265,200.

In 1935, B. H. Wilsdon was appointed director of WIRA; he retained this position until 1949. During Wilsdon's tenure, the tempo of research at WIRA noticeably increased. The dry chlorination process for producing non-felting wool was production-ready in 1939; this helped ensure that the uninforms provided to members of the British armed forces were much less likely to suffer shrinkage. Amid the Second World War, WIRA urgently researched fabric impregnation with active charcoal; originally intended as an anti-gas measure, it was extensively used to absorb bad odours from anaerobically dressed wounds. The benefits of this research were not limited to the domestic market, making a noticeable impact in both Australia and the United States.

Between 1943 and 1948, a series of new permanent buildings were built at Torridon for WIRA; these facilities included new blocks for physics and woollen studies, along with workshops, drawing offices and a central steam plant for heating purposes. While originally planned, an additional wing to house a library, offices, and cafeteria was postponed.

During the latter half of the twentieth century, it was rebranded as Wira Technology Group. During 1989, WIRA merged with the Shirley Institute to form the British Textile Technology Group (BTTG). The BTTG opted to base themselves at The Towers, which was formerly the main research centre of the Shirley Institute.

== Notable employees ==
- Richard Laurence Millington Synge
- Jim Marshall (UK politician)
- David Cox (statistician)
- Archer J.P. Martin

=== Martin and Synge ===
Archer J.P. Martin and Richard L.M. Synge worked together at WIRA in Leeds. In 1941, they published a paper entitled ‘A New Form of Chromatogram Employing Two Liquid Phases’ in the Biochemical Journal. Martin and Synge described how they had used columns of silica with water, used as the stationary phase, whilst a second, non-miscible liquid, flowed down the column. The second liquid was the organic solvent chloroform, and they separated acetamino-acids from protein hydrolysates. The components of the mixture separated were distributed between the two phases, depending on their relative affinity for each of the phases. As the components spread, they became separated from each other, and could be collected as they left the column. This is how partition chromatography came to be known as a new form of chromatography due to the way that the sample ‘partitioned’ itself between the two liquid phases. Their paper was important because it laid the foundations of all the future work in the field of chromatography. In the first part of the paper they presented the first ever theory of chromatography that attempted to explain the concentration of the solute at any point in the column and also how the resolution of the column was affected by various factors including the column's length. Looking at the figures they present for resolution in terms of Height Equivalent to a Theoretical Plate (HETP), underlying the importance of their work at that time. The HETP is a measure of the resolution that can be obtained by the column. There are several factors that affect HETP. In recognition of their work to develop the field of chromatography both Martin and Synge were awarded the 1952 Nobel Prize in Chemistry.
