= Alan D. Roberts =

British scientist

- Education: University of Cambridge
- Known for: JKR model
- Awards: Charles Goodyear Medal (2014)
- Scientific career
- Fields: Contact mechanics
- Workplaces: Tun Abdul Razak Research Centre
- Doctoral advisor: David Tabor

Alan D. Roberts is a Tun Abdul Razak Research Centre (TARRC) scientist noted for his contributions to understanding contact phenomena in elastomers, and in particular the JKR model.

== Education ==
Roberts completed his Doctor of Philosophy degree in 1968, having worked in the Cavendish laboratory at the University of Cambridge, under the supervision of tribologist David Tabor.

== Career ==
His 1971 paper with Kevin Kendall and Kenneth L. Johnson forms the basis of modern theories of contact mechanics.

In 1974, Roberts was recruited to the Applied Physics Group at the Malaysian Rubber Producers' Research Association (MRPRA) by Alan G. Thomas. He researched the sliding friction of rubber on wet surfaces and on ice, the effects of pH and salt concentration, and other effects.

In 1983, he was promoted to Assistant Director of MRPRA, and the following year to Deputy Director.

== Awards ==
Roberts received the 1998 Lavoisier Medal of the French Society of Chemical Industry, and in 2014 he received the Charles Goodyear Medal of the Rubber Division of the American Chemical Society.
