= Leonard Albert Wiseman =

British chemist

Leonard Albert Wiseman OBE (4 November 1915 – 20 January 2009) was an organic chemist, scientific intelligence analyst and scientific administrator. Following his early work as a research chemist and in intelligence, he became, successively deputy director of the Atomic Weapons Research Establishment, Director of the British Rayon Research Association, succeeding John Wilson, deputy director of the Cotton, Silk and Man-made Fibres Research Association when the BRRA merged with the British Cotton Industry Research Association (the Shirley Institute), becoming Director in 1969 until retiring in 1980. He also served for some years as Chairman of Council of the Textile Institute.

== Early life ==
Wiseman was born in North London, and enjoyed cross-country running and other sports as a child. He won a scholarship from the Stationers' Company's School to study chemistry at University College, London. He graduated with first class honours in 1936. He married Winifred and had a son. (He lived to see four grandchildren and four great-grandchildren.)

== Cambridge, Brunswick and Aldermaston ==
Following graduation, he received a scholarship to conduct research on the chemistry of sucrose. He also started to study other problems in organic chemistry. The outbreak of war prevented the presentation of his Ph.D. thesis, and delayed publication of some of his work, which did finally appear in the Proceedings of the Royal Society, many years later. He became an Assistant Lecturer in Chemistry and a Fellow of Kings College, Cambridge. Near the end of the war, he was appointed to the British Intelligence Objectives Sub-Committee and was sent Germany where he worked at the Luftwaffe Research centre in Brunswick. he became fluent in German and met his second wife, Hansi.

He then came back to the UK, to work as deputy director of the UK government Explosives Research and Development Establishment at Waltham Abbey. When the Atomic Weapons Research Establishment (AWRE) was created at Aldermaston, many of the Waltham Abbey staff played important roles in setting it up and developing its activities. Wiseman was among these and he was appointed deputy director in 1953, transferring to the Ministry of Supply in 1956 to oversee related production work. He directed and reported major studies of the physical chemistry of propellants and explosions - a logical continuation of his work at Waltham Abbey.

Wiseman wanted to turn his skills as a scientific administrator to more peaceful uses than atomic armaments. Accordingly, he accepted the role of Director of the British Rayon Research Association in 1958, when the incumbent, John Wilson retired. After BRRA merged with the British Cotton Industry Research Association (BCIRA) to become the British Cotton, Silk and Man-made Fibres Research, better known under the earlier name Shirley Institute, he became its deputy director, and Director from 1969 until his retirement in 1980.

His activity in the textile industry at large, helped it manage a period of contraction He served as Chairman of Council of the Textile Institute from 1979 to 1982.

As a linguist as well as a scientist, he also represented UK textiles abroad. He was appointed an OBE in 1974 for services to the textile industry.

He was also active in a number of societies including the Manchester Literary and Philosophical Society and Manchester Statistical Society.
