= Megan Robertson (scientist) =

Biopolymers researcher

Megan Lind Robertson
- Education: Washington University in St. Louis; University of California, Berkeley
- Scientific career
- Workplaces: University of Houston
- Thesis: Designing block copolymer surfactants for organizing immiscible homopolymers (2006)
- Doctoral advisor: Nitash P. Balsara
- Other academic advisors: Marc A. Hillmyer
- Website: The Robertson Research Group

Megan L. Robertson is a professor of chemical and biomolecular engineering at the University of Houston noted for her work in polymer chemistry towards achieving "green birth, green life, and green death" via recycling and via biosourced oils and fatty acids to develop new elastomers with the aim of replacing petrochemical sources.

== Education ==
Robertson earned her B.S. in Chemical Engineering at Washington University in St. Louis and her Ph.D. in Chemical Engineering at the University of California, Berkeley working under the direction of Prof. Nitash Balsara. After working at Rohm and Haas (now Dow Chemical) as a senior scientist for two years, she joined the group of Marc Hillmyer at the University of Minnesota as a postdoctoral research associate.

== Career ==
In 2010 she joined the Department of Chemical and Biomolecular Engineering at the University of Houston, and in 2021 she became a full professor. She has received funding from the Department of Defense to investigate chitin-based bulletproof coatings and leads an interdisciplinary team funded through the Welch Foundation to transform polyolefin plastic waste into useful materials. Her most cited work, which was published in Science, is a review on the topic of plastics and recycling. She is an Associate Editor at Macromolecules (journal) and is on the editorial advisory board of the European Polymer Journal. She is a member of the National Academies of Sciences, Engineering, and Medicine Board on Chemical Sciences and Technology.

== Awards and recognition ==
- 2014 – NSF CAREER Award
- 2015 – Kavli Fellow of the National Academy of Sciences
- 2017 – PMSE Young Investigator
- 2018 – Sparks–Thomas award from the ACS Rubber Division
- 2022 – Fellow of the American Chemical Society
- 2023 – National Science Foundation Special Creativity Award
