= Mary Corner =

British pharmacist

- Born: 25 March 1899
- Died: 4 November 1962 (aged 63)
- Occupation: Chemist
- Known for: She was a founding member of the Microchemical Club.

Mary Corner (25 March 1899 – 4 November 1962), was an English pharmacist, a worker in the British Cotton Industry and British Leather Manufacturers, Head of the Micro-analytical Section of the Chemical Research Laboratory, Vice-Chairman of the Microchemistry group and a founding member of the Microchemical Club.

== Early life and education ==
Mary Corner was educated at Beulah House High School, Balham, London. As a child, Corner had an "unfortunate accident" and "burdened with a severe disability, and she had, in addition, more than the usual share of suffering and trouble."

== Career ==
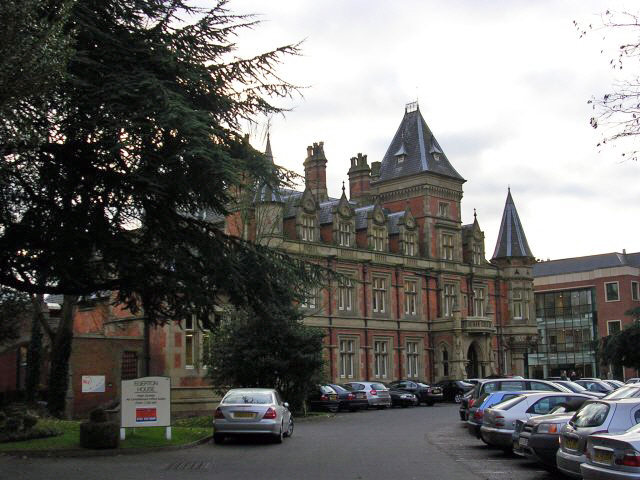
'The Towers' - where Corner worked for the British Cotton Industry Research Association

During the First World War, Mary worked in a pharmacy, entering Battersea Polytechnic a forerunner of the University of Surrey, in 1922 and graduating in 1927.

She obtained a position with the British Cotton Industry Research Association in Didsbury, Manchester, in 1928, working initially in the rayon department where she developed a fascination with microanalysis which resulted in a promotion to Head of the Microanalytical Section. Then, in 1945, she obtained a similar post with the British Leather Manufacturers' Research Association.

Two years later, Corner was invited to become Head of the newly formed Microanalytical Section of the Chemical Research Laboratory (later the National Chemical Laboratory).

In the 1930s, she became a founder member of the Microchemical Club (to be later joined by Isabel Hadfield).

In 1953, she was elected an Ordinary Member of the Council for the Society of Public Analysts and Analytical Chemists.

== Death ==
At the time of her death on 4 November 1962, she was Vice Chair of the Microchemistry Group of the Society for Analytical Chemistry.
