= Shirley Institute =

Textile research organisation in the UK

Coordinates: 53.4081°N 2.2262°W

- Formation: 1920; 106 years ago
- Purpose: Research association for the textile sector
- Location: Trafford Park, Manchester, United Kingdom
- Region served: Worldwide

The Shirley Institute was established in 1920 as the British Cotton Industry Research Association (BCIRA). It was long based at The Towers in Didsbury, Manchester, which operated as a research centre dedicated to technologies pertaining to the textile sector.

The BCRA merged with the British Rayon Research Association (BRRA) to form the Cotton, Silk, and Man-Made Fibres Research Association in 1961. During the late 1980s, the entity merged again, this time with the Wira Technology Group, creating the British Textile Technology Group (BTTG).

== History ==
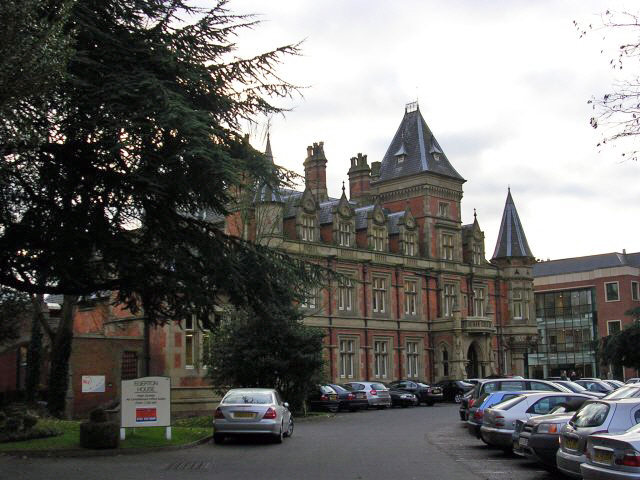
The Towers, location of the Shirley Institute

The organisation originated with the British Cotton Industry Research Association (BCIRA), which was founded in 1920. The impetus for its creation came on the back of prior Parliament approval of a £1 million fund to support industrial research and a corresponding scheme for the establishment of research associations connected with various industries, which typically each received a grant for five years on a fifty-fifty basis towards their expenses. Accordingly, the BCIRA was financially supported by the Department of Scientific and Industrial Research (DSIT) as well as by voluntary funds from industry. Following the creation of the Cotton Board during the Second World War, funding for the BCIRA also came from the Board. A significant contribution towards the purchase of its primary premises, The Towers, came from William Greenwood, the MP for Stockport, who requested that the building be named after his daughter, which accordingly became the Shirley Institute.

The BCIRA was credited with several key developments. Specifically, it developed Ventile, a special high-quality woven cotton fabric that was researched on behalf of the Ministry of Defence; it was patented and licensed to industry. It also developed the tog, an easy-to-follow measure of the thermal resistance of textiles, as an alternative to the SI unit of m^{2}K/W.

In 1936, the BCIRA opened a section focused on silk.

By the mid 1950s, it was apparent that there was potential for overlap in the research perform by the BCRA and the British Rayon Research Association (BRRA). Accordingly, an official agreement between the two associations to avoid duplication was enacted in 1957. However, this arrangement did not restrict the BCIRA's ability to conduct research into man-made fabrics, the manufacturers of which started paying a research levy to the Cotton Board in 1961. Furthermore, political pressure was present for a merger of the BCIRA and BRRA. Accordingly, in early 1961, the BCRA and BRRA formally amalgamated to form the Cotton, Silk, and Man-Made Fibres Research Association (CSMFRA); BCRA's research institute at Didsbury was retained and its laboratories were enlarged to accomidate the additional staff while the BRRA's former laboratories at Heald Green, Manchester, were sold and remaining assets transferred.

Shortly following the creation of CSMFRA, Leonard Albert Wiseman, formerly director of the BRRA, was appointed as its deputy director, and later became director of research after the retirement of incumbent Douglas Hill in 1969. Initially, funding for CSMFRA continued to be provided both from DSIT grants and industry sources; however, the statutory industry levy model was phased out in favour of the sponsorship of individual research programmes; this in turn led to CSMFRA catering towards a wider clientele, including international customers, beyond its traditional textile niche.

By 1964, CSMFRA had started making use of analogue computers in its research. In 1965, it performed its first flammability tests. In 1973, it established a department focused on carpets.

During the late 1980s, the entity merged again, this time with the Wira Technology Group, to form the British Textile Technology Group (BTTG). The BTTG originally retained The Towers as their primary location under 2004, at which point it relocated to newer premises in Trafford Park. Two years later, it opened its first overseas offices, these being in Shanghai, China and Singapore; further offices followed in India, Bangladesh, Pakistan, and Kenya.

== See also ==
- Robert Howson Pickard FRS, Director 1937-1943.
- Mary Corner, ultimately Head of the Microanalytical Section.
