= Pamela J. Martin =

British Scientist

Pamela Jean Martin is a TARRC scientist recognized for her work on silica fillers in epoxidized natural rubber tire tread compounds to understand impacts on rolling resistance, wet grip and wear.

== Education ==
Martin studied chemistry, graduating from the University of Exeter in 2003 with a first class MChem. In 2008 she completed her doctorate at the University of York on the subject of liquid crystals.

== Career ==
Martin joined TARRC in 2008 as a materials scientist. Her initial work focused on the development of tire tread compounds based on epoxidised natural rubber (ENR or Ekoprena™). In 2017 she was awarded patent for a mixing procedure suitable for incorporating silica filler into polar rubbers, such as epoxidised natural rubber, resulting in low resistance and high wet grip.

== Awards and recognition ==
- 2019 - Sparks–Thomas award from the ACS Rubber Division.
