= Eric Miller (industrialist) =

British rubber industrialist (1882–1958)

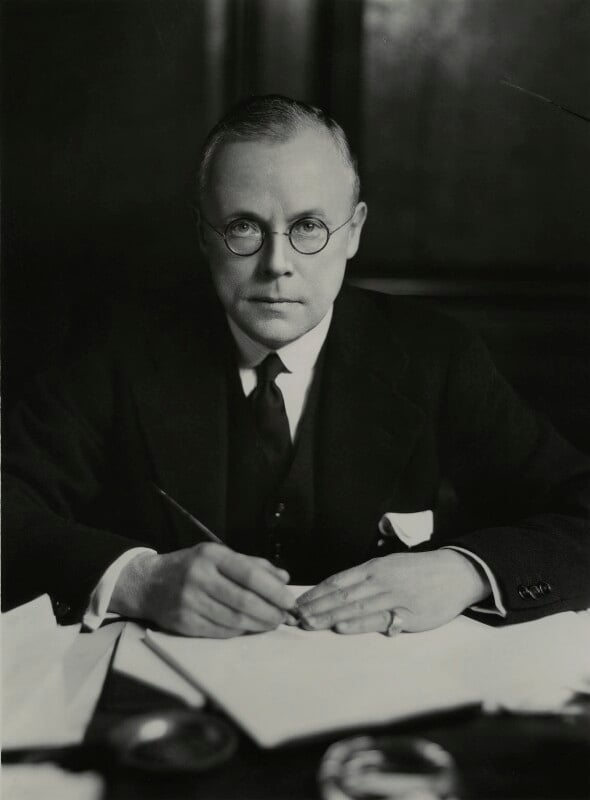
Miller in 1934

Sir Hans Eric Miller (12 June 1882 – 11 July 1958) was a leading figure in the British rubber industry, and played a prominent role in establishing research facilities such as the British Rubber Producers Research Association.

== Early life ==
Hans Eric Miller was born in Yorkshire and attended the Queen Elizabeth's Grammar School in Darlington. He then studied at the Leipzig School of Commerce for two years.

== Career ==
Miller entered business at the age of 18 at Harrisons and Crosfield, an import-export company. He was appointed a Director in 1908, aged 25, when the company was incorporated.

As a Director, he was largely concerned with developing a number of rubber plantation companies that Harrisons and Crosfield had an interest in. He became chairman in 1924 and represented them on many boards of rubber companies in which it had an interest, as well as the Port of London Authority. As a council member of the Rubber Growers' Association he became an early proponent of research and was in 1920 awarded an honorary gold medal for his efforts. He later became chairman of the British Rubber Producers Research Association, formed in 1938, and the International Rubber Development Board. He was also a sponsor of the International Rubber Regulation Committee, whose work these bodies was intended to complement. He was knighted in 1952 for this work.

== Personal interests and awards ==
He farmed, collected books and art. Aside from his gold medal from the Rubber Growers' Association and knighthood, he was also a Commander of the Order of Orange-Nassau.
