= John Wilson (industrial chemist) =

Former director of the BRRA (1890–1976)

John Wilson CBE, MC & Bar, FRIC
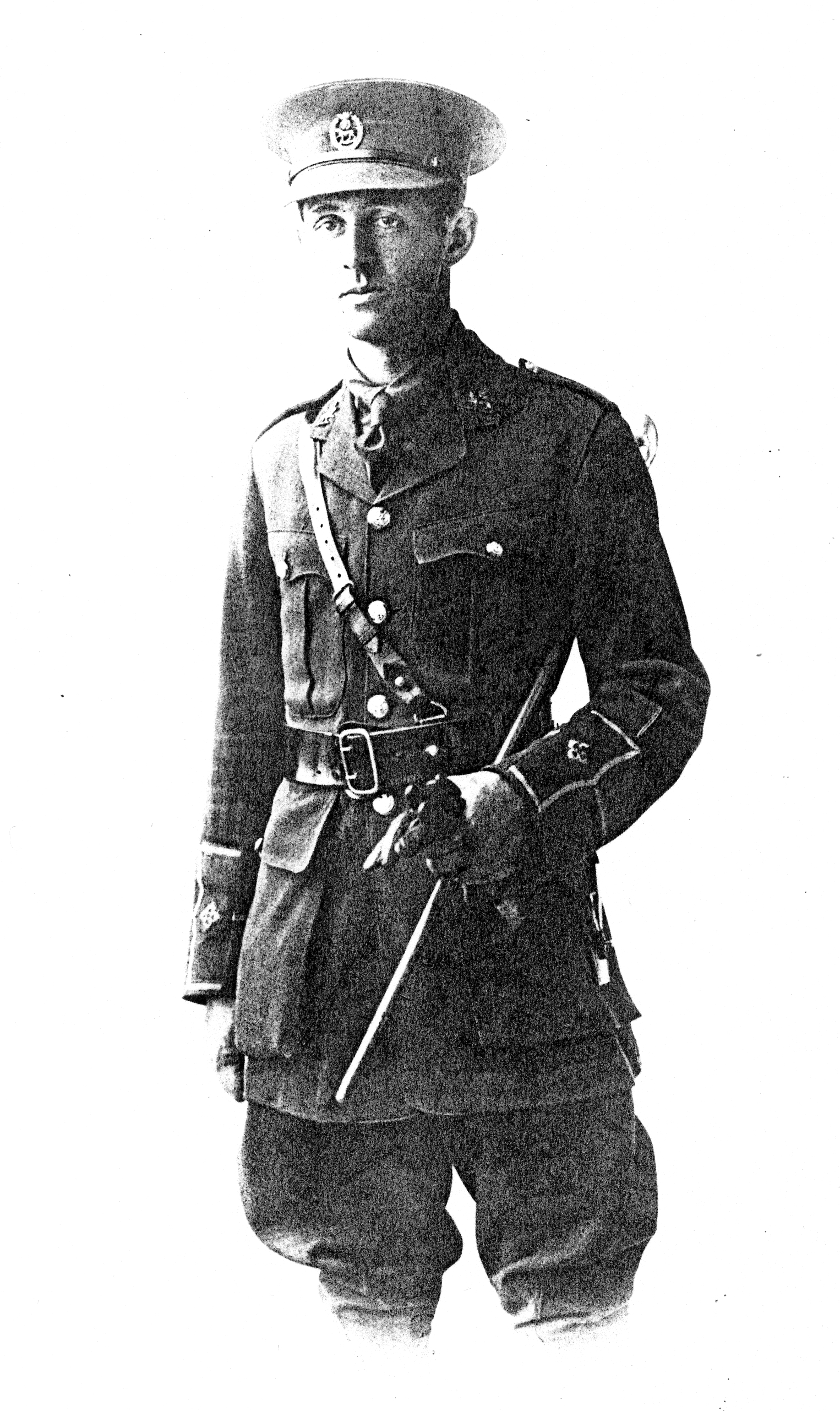
- Born: 6 September 1890; Edinburgh, Scotland
- Died: 8 September 1976 (aged 86)
- Occupation: Industrial chemist
- Known for: Director of the British Rayon Research Association, Director of the British Rubber Research Association

John Wilson, CBE, MC & Bar, FRIC (6 September 1890 – 8 September 1976) was Director of the British Rayon Research Association from 1948 to 1958. He was married to Edith Wilson (née Leech) and had six children.

== Early life ==
Wilson was born in Edinburgh to Isabella and Richard. He studied at Bingley Grammar School in Yorkshire and went on to obtain an MSc from the University of Sheffield. He was a captain in World War I, serving in France with the York and Lancaster Regiment, where he received the Military Cross twice and was mentioned in Dispatches. According to the London Gazette, Wilson:

Went out in daylight into “No Man's Land” over ground covered by enemy snipers, close up to an enemy “pill-box,” and secured an identification from the bodies of two of the enemy who had been killed by a patrol. His courageous action secured a valuable identification.

On the second occasion, also in 1918, he:

Led his company with great dash and determination against a group of houses strongly held by the enemy, and drove them out with heavy casualties. Later, though severely wounded, he continued to direct operations until relieved of his command. He set a splendid example to all.

== Career ==
Wilson worked at Triplex Laboratories in Birmingham. As works chemist at Triplex Safety Glass Company (now Pilkington), he made a significant contribution to the development of safety glass. He then worked as director of research at the British Rubber Research Association from 1937 to 1947.

He was appointed Director of the British Rayon Research Association in 1948, where he worked until his retirement in 1958. He was appointed Commander of the Order of the British Empire in 1958. Under his stewardship, the BRRA became an organisation with an international reputation in its field and nearly 300 staff.

== Personality and foresight ==
Ronald Rivlin describes Wilson in 1944 as a "bluff, outgoing, middle aged Yorkshireman" who "enthusiastically encouraged" him in his research ideas around the theory of elasticity.

Wilson was said by his peers to be forceful and unconventional:

Directness was his very nature; he said what he meant and he meant what he said to anyone without fear or favour. With this moral courage went unconscionable physical bravery as revealed by his antics on war service in France where he took to night-time excursions in no-man's land to relieve boredom in front-line trenches, and also, more recently, by his car driving which could be quite fearful for passengers.

He was also credited as having insight into what was needed to make successful scientific research:

His contribution to industrial research was characterized by an ability to excite the interest of (and to support financially) academically experienced scientists. He not only awarded many postgraduate research studentships in order to train future staff but was also perceptive enough to finance more senior university research workers very early in the development of such diverse topics as organic crystal structure analysis, digital computers, flash photolysis and fluidised beds.

His interest in computers included sponsoring Andrew Donald Booth's APEXC while Director of the BRRA. He also appears to have attended one of the UK's first computer conferences.

He also credited with knowing how to pick and build a successful team:

He chose his staff on trusted recommendation or by intuition, and thus assembled a group which radically advanced the science of rubber [at the BRPRA] ... His stimulating ebullience, his concern with work not red tape, and his abiding principle to support and fight to the limit for his staff outside the laboratories (however much he might assail them inside) engendered immense loyalty and a wonderful team spirit.

== Later life ==
During the 1960s until his death, Wilson pursued research into producing cellulose pulp, the raw product used in paper production, from bamboo. Trials took place in Argyll and Ireland. He had started work on the problem while at the BRRA, as rayon manufacturers were a large importer of cellulose.
