= Tun Abdul Razak Research Centre =

Publicly-funded institute in Malaysia

- Abbreviation: TARRC
- Formation: 1938; 88 years ago
- Legal status: Research center
- Purpose: Rubber research and development
- Headquarters: Brickendonbury Estate
- Location: Brickendon, United Kingdom
- Region served: Worldwide
- Methods: Research, publication
- Website: tarrc.co.uk
- Formerly called: British Rubber Producers' Research Association

The Tun Abdul Razak Research Centre, originally known as the British Rubber Producers' Research Association, carries out research into rubber and is funded by the Malaysian government.

== Early years: as the British Rubber Producers Research Association: 1938 to 1957 ==
The British Rubber Producers Research Association was formed as a scientific research organization in 1938 'to understand rubber and in pursuit of this aim to mount a programme of fundamental research', since at that time the technology was almost entirely empirical. It carried out fundamental work on rubber, which included the more general polymer science and the physics and mathematics of rheology and in addition contributed to early work on electronic computers.

Prominent in the push for greater rubber research and the establishment of the association was Sir Eric Miller, who became chairman of the BRPRA.

In 1939, it obtained its first premises in Welwyn Garden City. It was largely funded by a levy on British-owned companies with plantations in Malaya and Ceylon.

Its Director of Research from 1938 to 1947 was John Wilson. His:

unconventional qualities, combined as they were with super-abundant energy and remarkable visionary zeal, proved their value as he built up the BRPRA in a difficult period and made it a world-renowned research unit within a decade or so. He chose his staff on trusted recommendation or by intuition, and thus assembled a group which radically advanced the science of rubber [at the BRRA], sowed seeds that have produced substantial commercial fruits, and which was to become the source of distinguished alumni in high academic and industrial posts in this country, America and elsewhere ... [Wilson's] stimulating ebullience, his concern with work not red tape, and his abiding principle to support and fight to the limit for his staff outside the laboratories (however much he might assail them inside) engendered immense loyalty and a wonderful team spirit.

He resigned to become Director of the newly formed British Rayon Research Association. A number of staff followed him, including LRG Treloar.

== After de-colonisation and Malaysian independence ==
In 1957, Malaya achieved independence from British Rule and the name was changed to the Natural Rubber Producers' Research Association. By the start of the 1970s, its research priorities included new methods of vulcanisation, injection moulding of rubber and developing anti-oxidants to protect against the deterioration of rubber.

During this period, the Association produced work on the engineering uses of rubber. This, by 1964, led to the development of rubber mounts for buildings to protect against vibrations. eventually this led to the use of mounts to protect against earthquakes. In later years, this work was extended to smaller buildings.

In 1973, it was changed to the Malaysian Rubber Producers' Research Association. In 1974, the research base was relocated to Brickendonbury, Hertfordshire in a mansion which had been used for the children's television series Catweazle. In 1977, it was named the Tun Abdul Razak Laboratory.

Later research included work on blends of rubber and synthetics, such as nitrile, ethylene propylene rubber and Epoxidised natural rubber.

The centre also worked on the performance of tyre retread compounds, showing that natural rubber-rich tyres could perform nearly as well as synthetic tyres in durability, but were more fuel efficient as they had lower rolling resistance.

The centre also developed an entirely new material, thermoplastic epoxidized natural rubber. This has excellent oil-resistance and heat resistance.

== Tun Abdul Razak Research Centre ==
In 1996, it became the Tun Abdul Razak Research Centre, a wholly owned company of the Malaysian Rubber Board. The centre has various research focusses including advanced materials, products, engineering and Biotechnology. Whilst the main purpose is to support the Malaysian rubber industry, the commercial division, Rubber Consultants offers a variety of testing and other services. These include compounding, physical testing, engineering design tyre testing and analytical services.

== Researchers ==
=== Notable people who worked at the BRPRA ===
- Edgar Andrews
- Andrew Donald Booth
- Leslie Clifford Bateman
- John R. Dunn
- Alan Neville Gent
- Karl A. Grosch
- Norman Haworth
- Graham J. Lake
- Peter Brian Lindley
- William Moffitt
- Pamela J. Martin (scientist)
- Alan H. Muhr
- Leonard Mullins
- Ronald Rivlin
- Alan D. Roberts
- Adolf Schallamach
- Alan G. Thomas
- LRG Treloar
- John Wilson (industrial chemist), Director of Research 1938-47
