= Leslie Clifford Bateman =

Tan Sri Leslie Clifford Bateman (12 March 1915 – 26 October 2005) was the last non-citizen of Malaysia to be appointed to any establishment connected to the government of Malaysia, as the Controller of Rubber Research in 1962. Bateman was a strong proponent of grading rubber, and pushed for the introduction of the process into the Malaysian rubber industry as the Standard Malaysian Rubber (SMR) scheme. He believed this was the only way natural rubber could survive against the synthetic rubber products introduced during World War II.

Bateman received his early education from Bishopshalt School, Uxbridge, and went on to the University College London, where he received a First class Honours degree in chemistry in 1935. He went on to earn a PhD and win the Ramsay Memorial Prize for best student of the year. During his life, Bateman wrote a total of 70 papers on natural rubber, mostly dealing with oxidation and sulphuration reactions.

During World War II Bateman devised rubber hoses that could handle petroleum, and later joined the British Rubber Producers Research Association as a physical chemist. He became the association's director of research in 1954. In 1962, he was appointed as the Controller of Rubber Research and the chairman of the Malayan Rubber Fund Board. Batesman left these postings in 1974 and became the secretary-general of the International Rubber Study Group in 1975. In Mar 1968 he was elected a Fellow of the Royal Society

He retired in 1983, and suffered a stroke in 2002. He died on 26 October 2005, and was eulogised in an obituary placed in the New Straits Times by the director-general and staff of the Malaysian Rubber Board.
