= APEXC =

Series of early computers

The APE(X)C, or All Purpose Electronic (X) Computer, is a series of stored-program electronic computers that were designed by Andrew Donald Booth and built with the close collaboration of his wife Kathleen Booth at Birkbeck College, University of London, in the early 1950s. Sponsored in part by the British Rayon Research Association (BRRA), the project produced several machines in the early to mid-1950s and provided the design basis for the commercially manufactured Hollerith Electronic Computer (HEC) series, an early British production-scale computer line that ran into the late 1950s and evolved into the ICT 1200 series. Booth maintained that the "X" in the name stood for "X-company", referring to an unnamed sponsor.

== Background ==
From 1943 onwards, Andrew Booth worked at Birkbeck under the crystallographer J. D. Bernal on the determination of crystal structures by X-ray diffraction. The numerical calculations involved were prohibitively laborious to perform by hand, and provided a strong incentive to automate the process. Booth's first machine in this line was an analogue computer designed to compute the reciprocal spacings of diffraction patterns.

In 1947, the Booths visited John von Neumann at the Institute for Advanced Study in Princeton, where they learnt of the von Neumann architecture for stored-program computers. On returning to Birkbeck, Andrew Booth substantially redesigned the relay computer he had been working on (the Automatic Relay Computer, ARC) along stored-program lines, while Kathleen Booth co-authored with him the report General Considerations in the Design of an All Purpose Electronic Digital Computer (1947), which set out the design of what would become the APE(X)C. Between 1947 and 1948 the Booths built the electromechanical ARC under BRRA sponsorship, followed by an experimental valve machine known as the Simple Electronic Computer (SEC), developed around 1948-1949.

== Design ==
The APE(X)C was a fully electronic stored-program machine based on the von Neumann architecture, but engineered with significantly different choices from the IAS machine at Princeton. It used vacuum tubes for logic and a magnetic drum for main memory, in place of the Williams tube storage favoured by most early IAS-derived machines. The Booths are credited with the development of the first practical rotating drum storage, a contribution arising directly out of the design of these early machines.

The standard machine had a word length of 32 bits and a basic store of 1,024 words on the drum, with serial arithmetic implemented in valves. Input and output on most of the series was via teleprinter (keyboard and printer with paper-tape reader and punch), with the exception of the APE(H)C, which used punched cards.

== Construction ==
After a 1950 design of an All-Purpose Electronic Computer (APEC), Booth built the first full-scale prototype in his father's barn between 1950 and 1951. In early 1951 the BRRA commissioned a dedicated version of the machine, designated APE(R)C, with the "R" denoting the sponsoring organisation. In March 1951, the British Tabulating Machine Company (BTM), which had ended its IBM affiliation in 1949, sent a team of engineers to visit the barn where the APE(R)C was being assembled and copied the circuitry of the machine for use in its own Hollerith Electronic Computer. The APE(R)C itself was completed and put into use at the BRRA in June 1952.

The APE(X)C proper, installed at Birkbeck College in London, was first operated in May 1952 and ready for routine use by the end of 1953.

== Machines in the series ==
The APE(X)C series comprised the following machines, with the bracketed letter typically standing for the sponsoring or hosting organisation:

- APE(X)C, also known as the All Purpose Electronic X-Ray Computer, at Birkbeck College, London; first operated May 1952, in routine use from end of 1953.
- APE(R)C, at the British Rayon Research Association; in routine use from June 1952.
- APE(N)C, at the Board of Mathematical Machines in Oslo, also known as NUSSE, with the "N" understood to stand for Norway.
- APE(H)C, at the British Tabulating Machine Company; the "H" is presumed to denote Hollerith punched-card equipment marketed by the firm. Unlike the other machines in the series, the APE(H)C used punched cards rather than paper tape for input and output.
- UCC, at University College London, operational from around January 1956 and equipped with 8,192 words of drum storage, eight times that of the other machines in the series.
- MAC (Magnetic Automatic Calculator), also marketed as MAGIC, built by Wharf Engineering Laboratories, operational from February 1955; this version used germanium diodes in place of many of the vacuum tubes of earlier machines.

Apart from the HEC line (see below), only one of each of these machines was built. The various models were broadly similar in architecture but differed mainly in input/output equipment.

== Software and programming ==
Almost all of the programming and systems software for the ARC, SEC and APE(X)C series was written by Kathleen Booth. In the late 1940s, for the ARC2 redesign, she devised a symbolic notation (which she called "Contracted Notation") that allowed instructions for the machine to be written using mnemonics rather than binary or numeric machine code, and an associated translator to convert these mnemonics into the underlying machine code. This work is widely credited as the first assembly language and the first assembler.

The Booths set out the general programming methodology for the APE(X)C in their jointly-authored 1953 book Automatic Digital Calculators, which introduced the "Planning and Coding" style later widely adopted in British programming education. Kathleen Booth subsequently published the standalone monograph Programming for an Automatic Digital Calculator in 1958, which presented programming examples for the APE(X)C with and without optimum coding for its drum memory.

From 1955 the APE(X)C was also used in early machine translation experiments funded by the Rockefeller Foundation, leading to a public demonstration of automatic translation between human languages in November 1955.

== Commercial spin-off and legacy ==
In March 1951, after the BTM team's visit to Booth's workshop, the firm used the copied circuitry to build the Hollerith Electronic Computer 1 (HEC 1) before the end of 1951. The HEC 1 was a direct copy of Booth's design with the addition of punched-card input and output. A cleaner-cased version, the HEC 2, was built for the Business Efficiency Exhibition in 1953. A slightly modified HEC 2M (with "M" for "marketable") followed, of which eight machines were sold, and these were succeeded by the HEC 4, of which approximately 100 machines were sold in the late 1950s. Marketed as the ICT 1200 series after BTM's 1959 merger into International Computers and Tabulators, the HEC line became one of the best-selling British computers of the 1960s and a foundation of the subsequent ICL product range.

The Booths' work on the APE(X)C series also produced the Booth multiplication algorithm, a two's complement binary multiplication procedure that remains in widespread use in digital electronics today.

== See also ==
- Booth's multiplication algorithm
- Hollerith Electronic Computer
- Kathleen Booth
- NUSSE
- Magnetic drum memory
