= David Elliott (diplomat) =

British diplomat (1930–2023)

Sir David Murray Elliott, KCMG CB, (8 February 1930 – 10 February 2023) was a British diplomat widely known as one of the founding fathers of the European Single Market.

== Early life ==
Elliott was born in Lewisham, South London and educated at Bishopshalt School and the London School of Economics, where he was a Kitchener Scholar. During his time at the LSE he was approached by MI5 but turned the offer down.

== Early career ==
After completion of his national service in the Royal Air Force, in 1954 Elliott joined the Civil Service, initially within the Post Office, and then during the 1960s and 70s moving through various roles in the Ministry of Posts and Telecommunications. Following a posting between 1975 and 1978 to the UK embassy to Brussels while on secondment to the Diplomatic Service, he was appointed to a senior role as an Undersecretary within the European Secretariat of the Cabinet Office.

== Later career ==
In 1982, Elliott was appointed the UK’s Minister and Deputy Permanent Representative to Europe, a post he held until 1991. From 1986 to 1990, he and his boss, the Permanent Representative Sir David Hannay, successfully represented the UK in its negotiations with its European Treaty partners on the technical development, implementation, and workings of the European Single Market. In 1991, Elliott was appointed to a senior post within the European Institutions as Director General (Internal Market) in the Council Secretariat, with responsibility for the administrative aspects of implementing the Council’s plans around the operation and expansion of the single market and free-trade across the European Community.

== Retirement ==
Following his retirement in 1995, Elliott was until 2001 a Board member of the international aid charity CARE and was involved in the pre-accession preparations of six European nations which had applied to join the EU: Hungary, the Czech Republic, Lithuania, Poland, Romania, and Slovenia.

== Honours ==
Elliott was appointed a Companion of the Order of the Bath in the 1987 Birthday Honours, and was appointed Knight Commander of the Order of St Michael and St George in the 1995 Birthday Honours.

== Assessment ==
His obituary in The Times noted that from humble beginnings Elliott quickly came to the notice of the Foreign Office through his work ethic, quick mastery of technical detail and negotiating prowess, ending up as one of the founding fathers of the European Single Market.
