= Raymond Ogden =

British applied mathematician (born 1943)

- Born: Raymond William Ogden; September 19, 1943 (age 82)
- Education: University of Cambridge (PhD)
- Known for: Ogden material model Ogden–Roxburgh model
- Awards: Koiter Medal (2005); FRS (2006); William Prager Medal (2010); Timoshenko Medal (2016)
- Scientific career
- Fields: Applied Mathematics
- Workplaces: University of Glasgow
- Thesis: On Constitutive Relations for Elastic and Plastic Materials (1970)
- Doctoral advisor: Rodney Hill

Raymond William Ogden FRS (born 19 September 1943) is a British applied mathematician. He is the George Sinclair Professor of Mathematics at the Department of Mathematics and Statistics of the University of Glasgow.

== Education ==
Ogden earned his BA and PhD degrees from the University of Cambridge in 1970, under the supervision of Rodney Hill. His thesis was entitled On Constitutive Relations for Elastic and Plastic Materials.

== Work ==
Ogden's research has been focused on the nonlinear theory of elasticity and its applications. His theoretical contributions include the derivation of exact solutions of nonlinear boundary value problems, for both compressible and incompressible materials, and an analysis of the linear and nonlinear stability of pre-stressed bodies and related studies of elastic wave propagation.

In the field of applications, Ogden worked on modelling the elastic and inelastic behaviour of rubber-like solids. He has also made contributions to the biomechanics of soft biological tissues, the electroelasticity and magnetoelasticity of electromechanically sensitive elastomeric materials, and the effects on residual stress in materials that are capable of large elastic deformations.

His book, Non-Linear Elastic Deformations, published in 1984 and reissued in 1999, has become a standard reference in this branch of solid mechanics.

== Awards and honours ==
Ogden was awarded the ASME Koiter Medal in 2005 and the Prager Medal of the Society of Engineering Science in 2010. He was elected a Fellow of the Royal Society (FRS) in 2006.

In 2016, the American Society of Mechanical Engineers (ASME) awarded Ogden the Timoshenko Medal.
