= Mark D. Foster =

Academic in the field of Polymer Science

Mark D. Foster is the Thomas A. Knowles Professor of Polymer Science and Polymer Engineering, and associate dean of programs, policy and engagement at the University of Akron. His area of research is polymer surfaces and interfaces.

== Education ==
Foster completed his undergraduate studies in Chemical Engineering at Washington University in St. Louis in 1981. He completed his doctorate, also in Chemical Engineering at University of Minnesota, Twin Cities in 1987. He then took a postdoctoral Staff Scientist position at the Max Planck Institute for Polymer Research. He held a senior postdocotoral position under Frank S. Bates at the University of Minnesota during 1989–1990.

== Career ==
Foster joined the University of Akron Polymer Science faculty in 1990 at the rank of assistant professor. He served as chair of the department of polymer science from 2005 to 2008. Since 2008, he has held roles as associate Dean, College of Polymer Science and Polymer Engineering, as well as Director of the Akron Global Polymer Academy.

His most cited work treated the subject of epoxy-terminated self-assembled monolayers.

== Awards and recognition ==
- 2005 - Sparks–Thomas award from the ACS Rubber Division
