= Maria D. Ellul =

Retired ExxonMobil materials scientist

Maria D. Ellul is a retired ExxonMobil materials scientist known for her contributions to and development of commercial polyolefin and polyamide specialty thermoplastic elastomers, and recognized as one of the first prominent women scientists in the rubber industry.

== Education ==
Ellul was born in Malta. In 1977, she earned a B.Sc. in chemistry at The Royal University of Malta and was employed as an intern with Sterling Organics. In 1979, she completed the M.Sc. degree in Polymer Science from North London Polytechnic. She earned her Ph.D. in Polymer Science from The University of Akron in 1984 under advisor Alan Gent.

== Career ==
Ellul's first post-baccalaureate employment was in 1977 as a chemist at Dowty Seals Ltd. Her first employer following her doctorate was GenCorp/General Tire. In that role she conducted research on tire materials, adhesion of rubber and Fracture Mechanics. She joined ExxonMobil Chemical Co. in 1991 with its subsidiary Advanced Elastomer Systems. She held positions of increasing responsibility, eventually rising to principal scientist and retired as senior research associate.

She is known for both fundamental and applied contributions to polyolefin and polyamide based thermoplastic elastomer materials. She developed methods to control the morphology and rheology of polymer blends, and contributed to the understanding of the kinetics and thermodynamics of polymer blends, block / graft copolymers and dynamic vulcanization. Ellul's research lead to the commercialization of many specialty polymers including Santoprene Thermoplastic Vulcanizates, Exxcore Dynamically Vulcanized Alloys, Vistamaxx, Butyl and EPDM. She is an associate editor for the scientific journal Rubber Chemistry & Technology.

== Awards and recognition ==
- 1996 - Honored by the National Inventors Hall of Fame in the National Salute to Corporate Inventors.
- 1997 - Sparks–Thomas award from the ACS Rubber Division
- 1998 - Woman of the Year Award from Ohio Women's History Project
- 2005 - Chemistry of Thermoplastic Elastomers Award from the ACS Rubber Division
- 2010 - Department of Polymer Science Outstanding Alumni Award from The University of Akron
- 2016 - ExxonMobil Chiefs' Award
