= Sparks–Thomas Award =

Award by the American Chemical Society

The purpose of the Sparks–Thomas Award, given by the ACS Rubber Division, is to recognize and encourage outstanding contributions and innovations in the field of elastomers by younger scientists, technologists, and engineers. The award is named for Exxon scientists William J. Sparks and Robert M. Thomas, co-inventors of butyl rubber.

== Recipients ==
The following persons have received the award:

- 1987 – Gary R. Hamed
- 1990 – Robert P. Lattimer
- 1991 – C. Michael Roland
- 1993 – Walter H. Waddell
- 1997 – Maria D. Ellul
- 1998 – Anthony J. Dias
- 2004 – Andy H. Tsou
- 2005 – Mark D. Foster
- 2006 – Vassilios Galiatsatos
- 2007 – William V. Mars
- 2008 – Christopher G. Robertson
- 2009 – John M. Baldwin
- 2010 – James Busfield
- 2011 – Alfred J. Crosby
- 2012 – Liqun Zhang
- 2013 – Wilma Dierkes
- 2014 – Seiichi Kawahara
- 2015 – Julie Diani
- 2016 – Amit Das
- 2017 – Juan L. Valentin
- 2018 – Megan Robertson
- 2019 – Pamela Martin
- 2020 – David S. Simmons
- 2021 – Kevin A. Cavicchi
- 2022 – Baochun Guo
- 2023 – Lewis Tunnicliffe
- 2024 – Radek Stocek
- 2025 – Titash Mondal
- 2026 – Clement Robin

== See also ==
- List of chemistry awards
- International Rubber Science Hall of Fame: Another ACS award
- Melvin Mooney Distinguished Technology Award
- Charles Goodyear Medal
