= List of fellows of the Royal Society elected in 2006 =

Fellows of the Royal Society elected in 2006.

== Fellows ==
1. Roger William Alder
2. David Barford
3. Stephen M. Barnett
4. Allan Basbaum
5. Richard William Battarbee
6. Axel Dieter Becke
7. Valerie Beral
8. Edmund John Philip Browne
9. Peter James Donnelly
10. John Hugh David Eland
11. David John Ewins
12. David Malcolm Farmer
13. Marc Feldmann
14. Charles Thomas Bayley Foxon
15. Matthew John Aylmer Freeman
16. Karl John Friston
17. Nigel David Forster Grindley
18. Andy Hopper
19. Peter John Hunter
20. Richard James Jackson
21. Richard A. Jones
22. Calestous Juma
23. Michael Lockwood
24. Ruth Marion Lynden-Bell
25. Trudy Frances Charlene Mackay
26. Jerrold Eldon Marsden
27. Robert Anthony Martienssen
28. Ramesh Narayan
29. Raymond William Ogden
30. Peter Joseph Jacques Parker
31. John Martindale Pearce
32. Joseph Sriyal Malik Peiris
33. Michael Richard Edward Proctor
34. Atta ur Rahman
35. Helen Ruth Saibil
36. Nicholas Shepherd-Barron
37. Austin Gerard Smith
38. Nahum Sonenberg
39. Mriganka Sur
40. Peter Christopher West
41. Nicholas John White
42. Alan Geoffrey Wilson
43. David Phillip Woodruff
44. Ziheng Yang

== Foreign members ==
1. Kenneth Joseph Arrow
2. Edouard Brézin
3. Paul Josef Crutzen
4. Daan Frenkel
5. Roger Y. Tsien
6. Carl Richard Woese

== Honorary fellow ==
1. Ralph Kohn
