= John R. Dunn =

English chemist

John Robert Dunn (12 May 1930 – 14 July 2002) was a Polysar synthetic rubber research chemist

== Personal ==
Dunn was born in Andover, Hants, England. In his youth, he attended the Andover Grammar School. He became a Canadian citizen in 1980.

== Education ==
Dunn received his Bachelor of Science degree in chemistry in 1951 with first-class honors at King's College at the University of London. He completed his Ph.D. in physical chemistry at the University of Oxford in 1953.

== Career ==
Upon completing his education, he sailed to Canada aboard the S.S. Scythia of the Cunard Line. Dunn joined the National Research Council (NRC) in Ottawa as a research fellow from 1953 to 1955. After this post, Dunn joined the Natural Rubber Producers' Research Association in England as a senior chemist. He remained in this position until 1962, when he returned to Sarnia, Canada to join Polymer Corporation (later Polysar). Dunn remained with the company for the next 30 years, holding various management and scientific positions, and retiring in 1992 as a principal scientist in the new product research and development division. Dunn's research focused on vulcanization, aging and testing of rubbers including NR, BR, EPDM, butyl, NBR and HNBR. His most cited paper, published in 1959, treated the topic of stress relaxation during the thermal oxidation of vulcanized natural rubber.

== Awards ==
- 1966 – elected Fellow of the Chemical Institute of Canada
- 1993 – Melvin Mooney Distinguished Technology Award from Rubber Division of the ACS
- 1993 – International Institute of Synthetic Rubber Producers Technical Award
- 2001 – Institute of Materials' Colwyn Medal for his contributions to the synthetic rubber industry.
