= Ogden–Roxburgh model =

Model for hyperelastic materials

The Ogden–Roxburgh model is an approach published in 1999 which extends hyperelastic material models to allow for the Mullins effect. It is used in several commercial finite element codes, and is named after R.W. Ogden and D. G. Roxburgh. The fundamental idea of the approach can already be found in a paper by De Souza Neto et al. from 1994.

The basis of pseudo-elastic material models is a hyperelastic second Piola–Kirchhoff stress $\boldsymbol{S}_0$, which is derived from a suitable strain energy density function $W(\boldsymbol{C})$:

$$\boldsymbol{S} = 2 \frac{\partial W}{\partial \boldsymbol{C}}.$$

The key idea of pseudo-elastic material models is that the stress during the first loading process is equal to the basic stress $\boldsymbol{S}_0$. Upon unloading and reloading $\boldsymbol{S}_0$ is multiplied by a positive softening function $\eta$. The function $\eta$ thereby depends on the strain energy $W(\boldsymbol{C})$ of the current load and its maximum $W_{max}(t) := \max\{W(\tau), \tau \le t\}$ in the history of the material:

$$\boldsymbol{S} = \eta(W, W_{max}) \boldsymbol{S}_0, \quad \text{where } \eta
\begin{cases}
= 1, \quad & W = W_{max},\\
< 1, & W < W_{max}.
\end{cases}$$

It was shown that this idea can also be used to extend arbitrary inelastic material models for softening effects.
