= Wilma Dierkes =

University of Twente Associated Professor

Wilma K. Dierkes is a University of Twente Associate Professor and chair of the Elastomer Technology and Engineering group known for her research on elastomer sustainability.

== Education ==
Dierkes completed an undergraduate degree in chemistry at Leibniz University in Hannover, Germany in 1990. After a period working in industry, she returned to study for a PhD in polymer science at University of Twente, completing her doctorate in 2010. She completed postgraduate study in environmental science at Foundation Universitaire Luxembourgeoise, Arlon, Belgium.

== Career ==
Dierkes entered the rubber industry in 1991. She worked on elastomer recycling at the company Rubber Resources in Maastricht. Here, she was responsible for development and technical service, and implemented recycling of production waste. She later joined Degussa working on carbon black research, and Bosch working on windshield wiper development.

She joined the University Twente, the Netherlands in 2001. She is currently an associate professor. From 2009 to 2013, she held a visiting professorship at Tampere University of Technology. From 2005 to 2014, Dierkes served as chairman of the Dutch Association of Plastics and Rubber Technologists (VKRT). She is also a founding member of the Female Faculty Network at the University Twente (FFNT) and has served on its board. She serves on the expert committee for the Recircle Awards, which is composed of "individuals from the global tyre retreading and recycling industries selected according to their independent status and their acknowledged expertise".

Dierkes' most cited works address the topics of recycling of natural rubber based latex products and silica filler technology for application in tire tread compounding. She has advocated for an open source approach to research and development in the tire industry.

== Awards and recognition ==
- 2013 - Sparks–Thomas award from the ACS Rubber Division
