= Bishopshalt School =

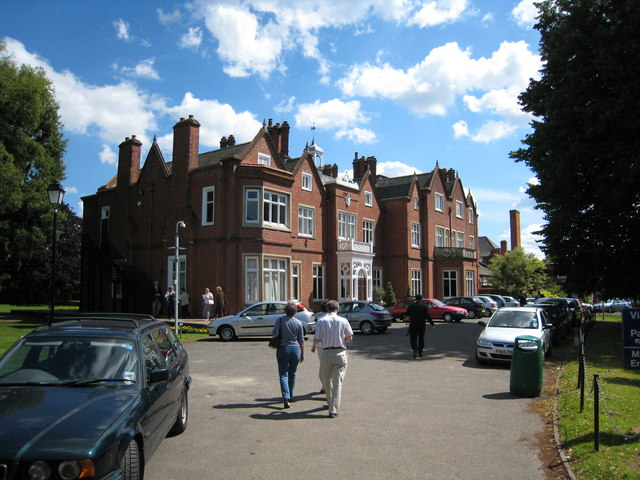

Location
- Royal Lane; Hillingdon, Greater London, UB8 3RF; England; 51.532°N 0.460°W

Information
- Type: Academy
- Motto: Fidelis
- Established: 1907
- Department for Education URN: 137633 Tables
- Ofsted: Reports
- Headteacher: Liam McGillicuddy
- Gender: Coeducational
- Age: 11 to 18
- Enrolment: 1262
- Website: http://www.bishopshalt.hillingdon.sch.uk

Bishopshalt School is a secondary school and sixth form with academy status based in the London Borough of Hillingdon. It has specialisations in music and the performing arts. Between 2013 and 2014, the school was used for scenes in the BBC sitcom Big School.

== History ==
The current building within which the school is housed was built in 1858. The school dates back to 1907 when it was first established as Uxbridge County School in The Greenway. It was designed by the architect H. G. Crothall for the Middlesex Education Committee. The Committee purchased the present site for £6900 in 1925 and in 1928 the school moved there. The original buildings in The Greenway became part of Uxbridge High School. On 6 October the school was officially opened by Sir John Reith, the Director-General of the BBC.

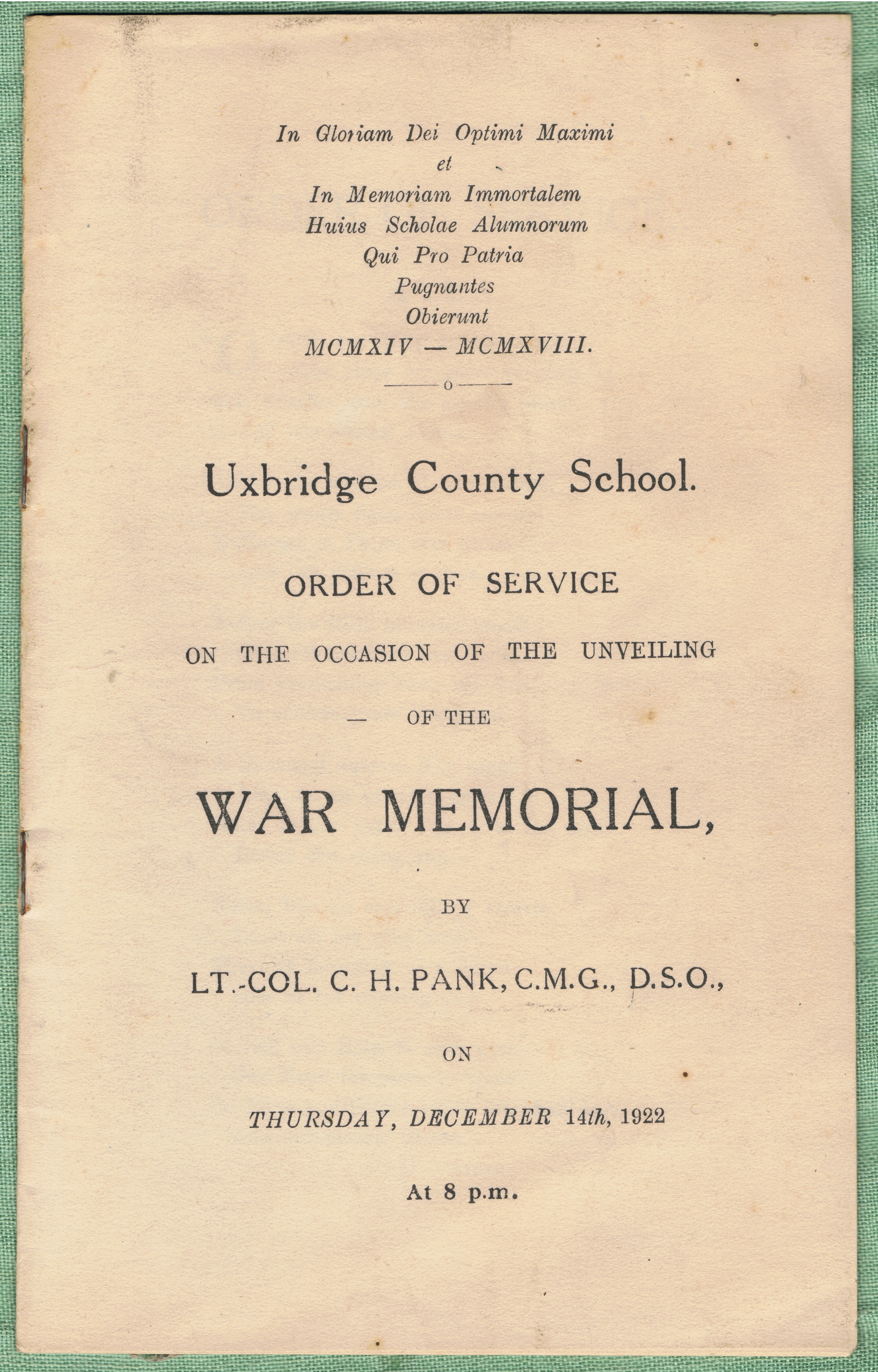
War Memorial unveiling's Order of Service cover, 14 December 1922.

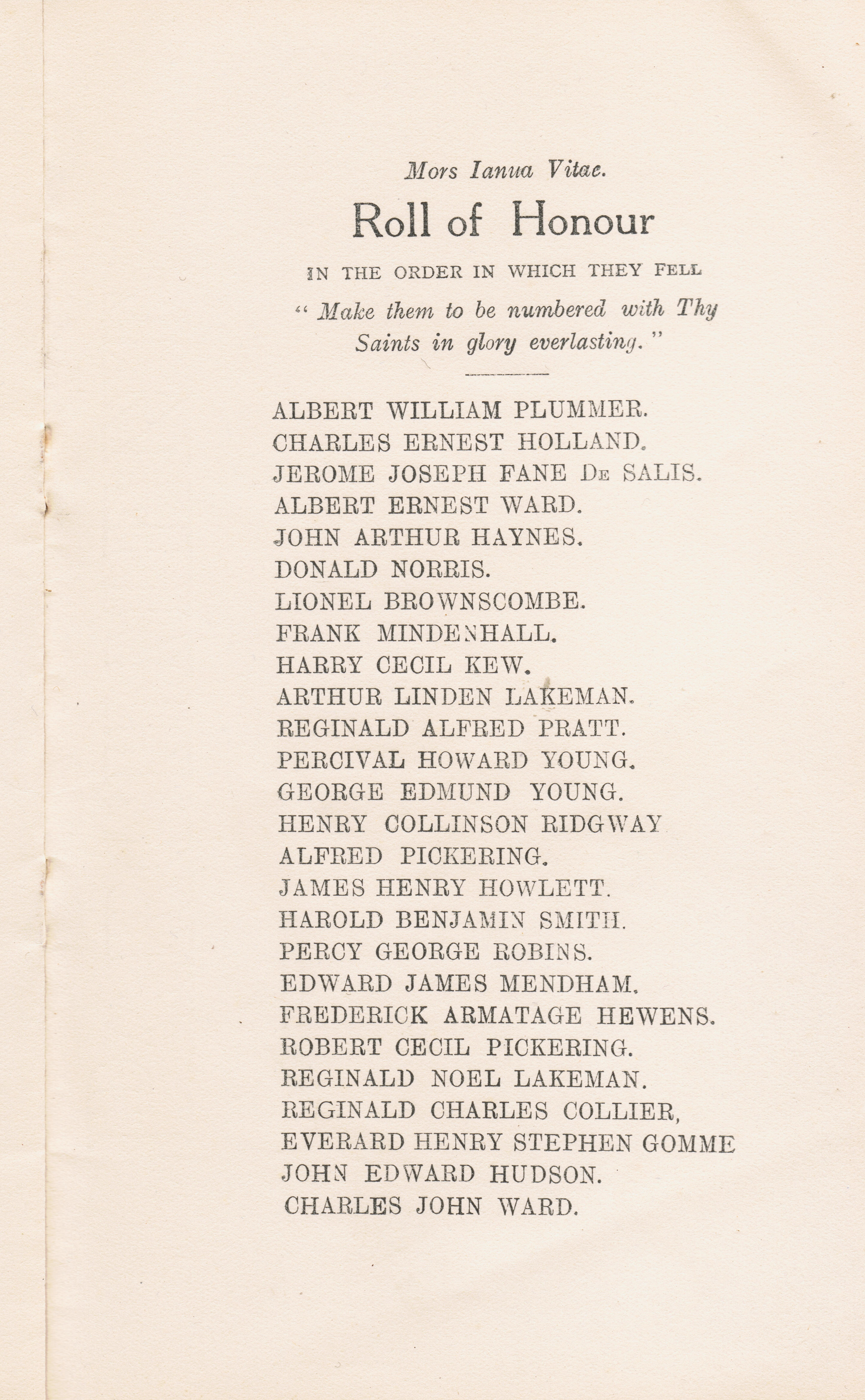
Roll of Honour, as printed in 1922.

Walter Wilks Sawtell was headmaster of the school from its founding in 1907 until 1929. He remained in the position to oversee the move of the school, before resigning to become rector of Madehurst in Sussex. The school name was changed to Bishopshalt School in 1930 to acknowledge it was no longer in Uxbridge. It is derived from the history of the site as for 500 years the Bishops of Worcester rested at the grounds of the school on their journeys to and from London.

A Cierva C.19 Mk.3 Autogiro landed on the school field in July 1931, piloted by the Cierva Autogiro Company's Flying Manager Reginald A.C. Brie, a former pupil of the school. During the Second World War, the school was used for rallies and inspections of the local Girls' Training Corps. Randalls of Uxbridge, a local family-owned department store, donated three oak chairs to the school in October 1949. In 1969, the school's air raid shelters were removed and replaced by a car park. The shelters had been built in 1939 but remained because of the threat of the Cold War.

The London Borough of Hillingdon held council meetings in the school hall while the Civic Centre in Uxbridge was under construction. In 1977 the school changed from a grammar school to a comprehensive.

An episode of Jeeves and Wooster starring Hugh Laurie and Stephen Fry was filmed in the school grounds. The school has also been used as a filming location, for the film adaptation of Angus, Thongs and Perfect Snogging, directed by Gurinder Chadha, and the BBC comedy Big School.

== Present day ==
The current headmaster is Liam McGillicuddy, who started in September 2019. Previous headteachers are Kim Rowe (2011 to 2019), David Bocock (2004 to 2011), Vincent Hodkinson (1996 to 2004) and Leslie Bather (1970–1996).

Bishopshalt School specialises in music and the performing arts. The front wooded area of the school is known as The Wilderness. Bishopshalt has six house system 'houses', five named after bishops that rested at the old mansion, on their first day out from London, going to Worcester in the days of horse-drawn coach travel. Cranmer, De Salis, Evesham, Manor, Stanley and Worcester are the houses. The school motto is Fidelis, meaning 'faithful'.

De Salis house was named after a local family that included bishop Charles De Salis and his elder brother Cecil Fane De Salis, who was a benefactor and governor of the school and last owner of the nearby Dawley Court at Goulds Green.

== Dramatic society ==
Bishopshalt School runs a dramatic society named Bishopshalt Operatic and Dramatic Society, known as BODS. The company is open to students at the school from the tenth to the thirteenth academic year. They perform annually during December. The latest BODS show was- '9 To 5.' The Junior BODS (for years 7,8 and 9) are performed in June/July every year. The latest Junior BODS show was- Moana Jr.

== Academic performance ==
It gets the third highest A level results in Hillingdon and above average results at GCSE. Bishopshalt also recently won the Hillingdon Maths challenge for Year 7. They have a successful netball and football team as well.

== Notable former pupils ==
Bishopshalt School

- Carla Mendonca, actor
- Claire Richards, singer

Bishopshalt Grammar School

- Lisa Adkins, Dean of the Faculty of Arts and Social Sciences, University of Sydney
- Leslie Clifford Bateman, Malaysian politician
- Vernon Bogdanor, professor of government at the University of Oxford
- David Elliott, diplomat
- John Taylor Hughes, Anglican Suffragan bishop of Croydon 1956–1977 and to the Forces 1966–1975
- Raheem Kassam (born 1986), political activist and journalist
- Oswald Morris, cinematographer
- Bernard Miles, character actor, writer and director
- Mel Read, Labour MEP for the East Midlands from 1999 to 2004
- Nick Simper, Deep Purple bass guitarist
- R. C. Vaughan, professor of pure mathematics at Imperial College London from 1980 to 1998 and at Penn State University from 1999
- John Arthur Watts, Conservative MP for Slough from 1983 to 1997, and Leader of Hillingdon Borough Council from 1978 to 1984
