= L. R. G. Treloar =

Professor Leslie R. G. Treloar
- Born: 30 July 1906
- Died: 18 March 1985 (aged 78)
- Occupations: Professor of Polymer & Fibre Science

Professor Leslie Ronald George Treloar, OBE (30 July 1906 – 18 March 1985) was a leading figure in the science of rubber and elasticity, and writer of a number of influential texts.

Leslie Treloar graduated in Physics from University College, Reading, in 1927 and subsequently joined GEC. He gained his PhD from the University of London (external degree) in 1938. After working for GEC he moved to the British Rubber Producers Research Association. He worked briefly at the Telecommunications Research Establishment during World War II.

He moved to the British Rayon Research Association when it was set up in 1948. He was a colleague of John Wilson.

He was awarded the Colwyn Medal "for outstanding services to the rubber industry of a scientific, technical or engineering character" in 1961, and the Swinburne Award for his "outstanding contribution to the advancement and knowledge of any field related to the science, engineering or technology of plastics" in 1970. He also was awarded the A. A. Griffith Medal and Prize in 1972.

He became Professor of Polymer & Fibre Science in the University of Manchester Institute of Science and Technology in 1966 and retired in 1974.

Professor Treloar's papers are held at the University of Manchester Library.

== Bibliography ==
Treloar published many texts and papers, of which the following is a selection:

=== Books ===
- L R G Treloar (1958), The physics of rubber elasticity, Oxford: Clarendon Press, cop., ISBN 978-0-19-857027-1
- L R G Treloar (1970), Introduction to polymer science, London, Wykeham Publications; New York, Springer-Verlag, ISBN 978-0-85109-100-6

=== Papers ===
- L R G Treloar (1 May 1936), "A method of measuring secondary-electron emission from filaments", Proceedings of the Physical Society, 48 (3): 488–497, Bibcode:1936PPS....48..488T, doi:10.1088/0959-5309/48/3/316
- L R G Treloar (1 July 1937), "Secondary-electron emission from complex surfaces", Proceedings of the Physical Society, 49 (4): 392–408, Bibcode:1937PPS....49..392T, doi:10.1088/0959-5309/49/4/310
- L R G Treloar; D H Landon (1 September 1938), "Secondary-electron emission from nickel, cobalt and iron as a function of temperature", Proceedings of the Physical Society, 50 (5): 625–634, Bibcode:1938PPS....50..625T, doi:10.1088/0959-5309/50/5/301
- L R G Treloar (1942), "The structure and elasticity of rubber", Reports on Progress in Physics, 9 (1): 113–136, Bibcode:1942RPPh....9..113T, doi:10.1088/0034-4885/9/1/312, S2CID 250906302
- L R G Treloar (1 September 1943), "The statistical length of paraffin molecules", Proceedings of the Physical Society, 55 (5): 345–361, Bibcode:1943PPS....55..345T, doi:10.1088/0959-5309/55/5/301
- L R G Treloar (1944). "Stress-strain data for vulcanised rubber under various types of deformation". Trans. Faraday Soc. 40: 59–70. doi:10.1039/TF9444000059.
- L R G Treloar (1946). "The elasticity of a network of long-chain molecules.—III". Trans. Faraday Soc. 49: 392. doi:10.1039/TF9464200083.
- L R G Treloar (1 February 1948), "Stresses and Birefringence in Rubber subjected to General Homogeneous Strain", Proceedings of the Physical Society, 60 (2): 135–144, Bibcode:1948PPS....60..135T, doi:10.1088/0959-5309/60/2/303
- N Wilson; L R G Treloar (April 1961), "Rubber models of yarns and cords; the 'doubling' of single rods", British Journal of Applied Physics, 12 (4): 147–154, Bibcode:1961BJAP...12..147W, doi:10.1088/0508-3443/12/4/306
- L R G Treloar (July 1962), "Rubber models of yarns and cords: continuum theory", British Journal of Applied Physics, 13 (7): 314–322, Bibcode:1962BJAP...13..314T, doi:10.1088/0508-3443/13/7/304
- Boyce, P.H.; Treloar, L.R.G. (1970). "The thermoelasticity of natural rubber in torsion". Polymer. 11 (1): 21–30. doi:10.1016/0032-3861(70)90059-5.
- H Wright; C S N Faraday; E F T White; L R G Treloar (December 1971), "The elastic constants of oriented glassy polymers", Journal of Physics D: Applied Physics, 4 (12): 2002–2014, Bibcode:1971JPhD....4.2002W, doi:10.1088/0022-3727/4/12/325, S2CID 250888351
- L R G Treloar (1972), "The social responsibilities of the scientist", Reviews of Physics in Technology, 3 (1): 65, doi:10.1088/0034-6683/3/1/103
- J D Wilson; L R G Treloar (September 1972), "The anisotropic thermal expansivity of oriented Perspex", Journal of Physics D: Applied Physics, 5 (9): 1614–1620, Bibcode:1972JPhD....5.1614W, doi:10.1088/0022-3727/5/9/317, S2CID 250827424
- L R G Treloar (July 1973), "The elasticity and related properties of rubbers", Reports on Progress in Physics, 36 (7): 755–826, Bibcode:1973RPPh...36..755T, doi:10.1088/0034-4885/36/7/001, S2CID 250852794
- D F Jones; L R G Treloar (1 August 1975), "The properties of rubber in pure homogeneous strain", Journal of Physics D: Applied Physics, 8 (11): 1285–1304, Bibcode:1975JPhD....8.1285J, doi:10.1088/0022-3727/8/11/007, S2CID 250802237
- H Vangerko; L R G Treloar (1 October 1978), "The inflation and extension of rubber tube for biaxial strain studies", Journal of Physics D: Applied Physics, 11 (14): 1969–1978, Bibcode:1978JPhD...11.1969V, doi:10.1088/0022-3727/11/14/009, S2CID 250869474
- L R G Treloar (1987). Non-Gaussian Theory of rubber in bi-axial strain. Manchester University Department of Computer Science.
