= Leonard Mullins =

- Education: University College London
- Known for: Mullins effect
- Awards: Charles Goodyear Medal (1986)
- Scientific career
- Fields: Polymer science
- Workplaces: BRPRA

Leonard Mullins (1918 – 19 September 1997) was a scientist and long-time Research Director at the former Malaysian Rubber Producers' Research Association. He is known for his work on the stress-softening behavior of rubber, a phenomenon now known widely as the Mullins effect.

== Personal ==
Mullins was born on 21 May 1918 and died on 19 September 1997 at the age of 79.

Leonard was the eldest of 7 children, with his brothers Eric, Kenneth, John, known as Alan, and sisters Sylvia, Muriel and Eugenie.

He married Freda Churchouse on 6 March 1943 and had 2 daughters Margaret and Janet.

== Education ==
Mullins graduated from University College London in 1939 BSC (Hons), PhD, DSc

== Career ==
He had originally hoped to enter academia, but World War II interrupted his plans and he ended up working in weapons research for the British government.

In 1949, he oversaw the dismantling of the Bayer A.G. rubber labs and pilot plant at Leverkusen, Germany.

In 1950, he joined the physics group of the British Rubber Producers' Research Association. He became deputy director of the group in 1960 and its director in 1962. He retired in 1983.

During his tenure, MRPRA's control shifted to Malaysia from Great Britain. He expanded the association's research team and laboratories.

== Awards and recognitions ==
- 1966 - Colwyn medal in 1956 from the former Institution of the Rubber Industry
- 1975 - honorary title Johan Mangku Negara for his work with natural rubber, bestowed by the king of Malaysia
- 1976 - CMG
- 1982 - Médaille de la ville de Paris
- 1985 - Outstanding Service Award from PRI
- 1986 - Charles Goodyear Medal from the ACS Rubber Division
- 1988 - Carl Harries|Carl-Dietrich Harries Medal from the German rubber organization Dkt
- 1988 - Eminent Citizen's Medal, Ho Chi Minh City
