= Payne effect =

Stress–strain behaviour of rubber

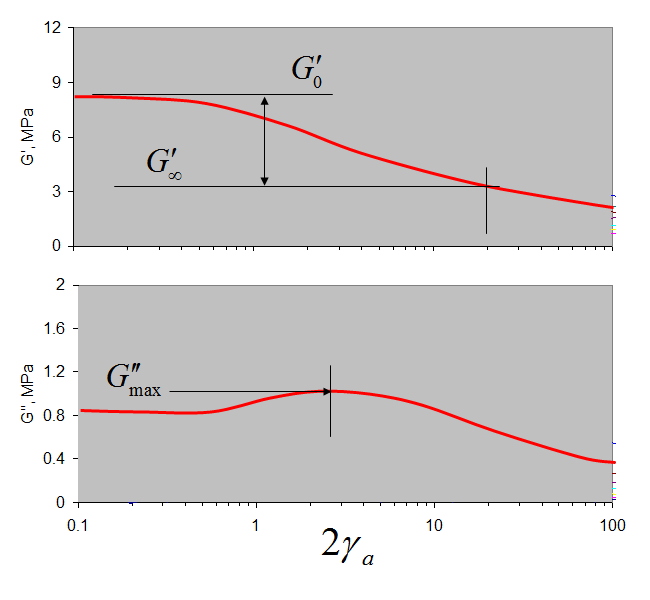
Strain amplitude dependence of storage and loss moduli in filled rubber.

The Payne effect is a particular feature of the stress–strain behaviour of rubber, especially rubber compounds containing fillers such as carbon black. It is named after the British rubber scientist A. R. Payne, who made extensive studies of the effect (e.g., Payne 1962). The effect is sometimes also known as the Fletcher-Gent effect, after the authors of the first study of the phenomenon (Fletcher & Gent 1953).

The effect is observed under cyclic loading conditions with small strain amplitudes, and is manifest as a dependence of the viscoelastic storage modulus on the amplitude of the applied strain. Above approximately 0.1% strain amplitude, the storage modulus decreases rapidly with increasing amplitude. At sufficiently large strain amplitudes (roughly 20%), the storage modulus approaches a lower bound. In that region where the storage modulus decreases the loss modulus shows a maximum. The Payne effect depends on the filler content of the material and vanishes for unfilled elastomers.

Physically, the Payne effect can be attributed to deformation-induced changes in the material's microstructure, i.e., to breakage and recovery of weak physical bonds linking adjacent filler clusters. Since the Payne effect is essential for the frequency and amplitude-dependent dynamic stiffness and damping behaviour of rubber bushings, automotive tires and other products, constitutive models to represent it have been developed in the past (e.g., Lion et al. 2003). Similar to the Payne effect under small deformations is the Mullins effect that is observed under large deformations.

== See also ==
- Mullins effect
