= The Towers, Manchester =

Listed building in Manchester, England

The Towers
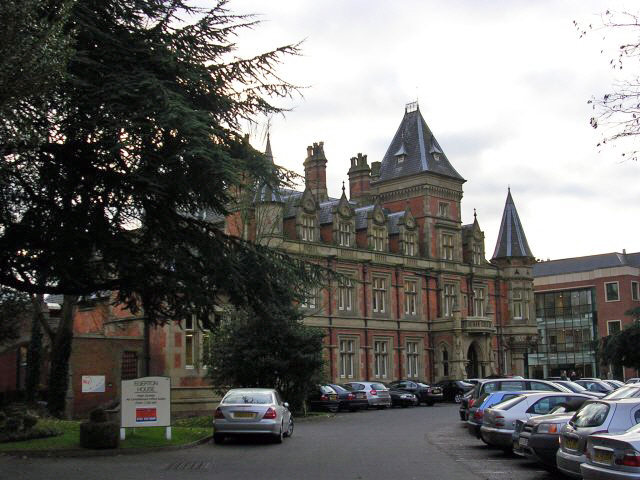
- The decision to build the Manchester Ship Canal was made here

- Location within Greater Manchester

General information
- Status: Converted to offices
- Architectural style: French château
- Location: Wilmslow Road, Manchester, England
- Coordinates: 53.4081°N 2.2261°W
- Construction started: 1868
- Completed: 1872
- Cost: £50,000
- Client: John Edward Taylor

Design and construction
- Architect: Thomas Worthington
- Other designers: Thomas Earp (sculptor)
- Designations

Listed Building – Grade II*
- Official name: The Towers (Shirley Institute)
- Designated: 4 March 1974
- Reference no.: 1270516

Listed Building – Grade II
- Official name: Lodge to the Towers (Shirley Institute) and attached gatepier
- Designated: 4 March 1974
- Reference no.: 1254974

The Towers (later known as the Shirley Institute, then the BTTG, and now part of Towers Business Park) is a Grade II* listed building on Wilmslow Road in Didsbury, a suburb of Manchester, England. Built between 1868 and 1872 for John Edward Taylor to designs by Thomas Worthington, it later became the home of engineer Daniel Adamson, where the Manchester Ship Canal project was first conceived in 1882. From 1920 it served as the headquarters of the Shirley Institute, later part of the British Textile Technology Group, before the estate was redeveloped as Towers Business Park in the early 21st century. The house remains in use as offices.

== History ==
The building was constructed between 1868 and 1872, for an estimated cost of £50,000. It was originally a house designed by Thomas Worthington, for the editor and proprietor of the Manchester Guardian, John Edward Taylor. The sculptural carvings were executed by the noted Victorian sculptor Thomas Earp.

=== Manchester Ship Canal ===
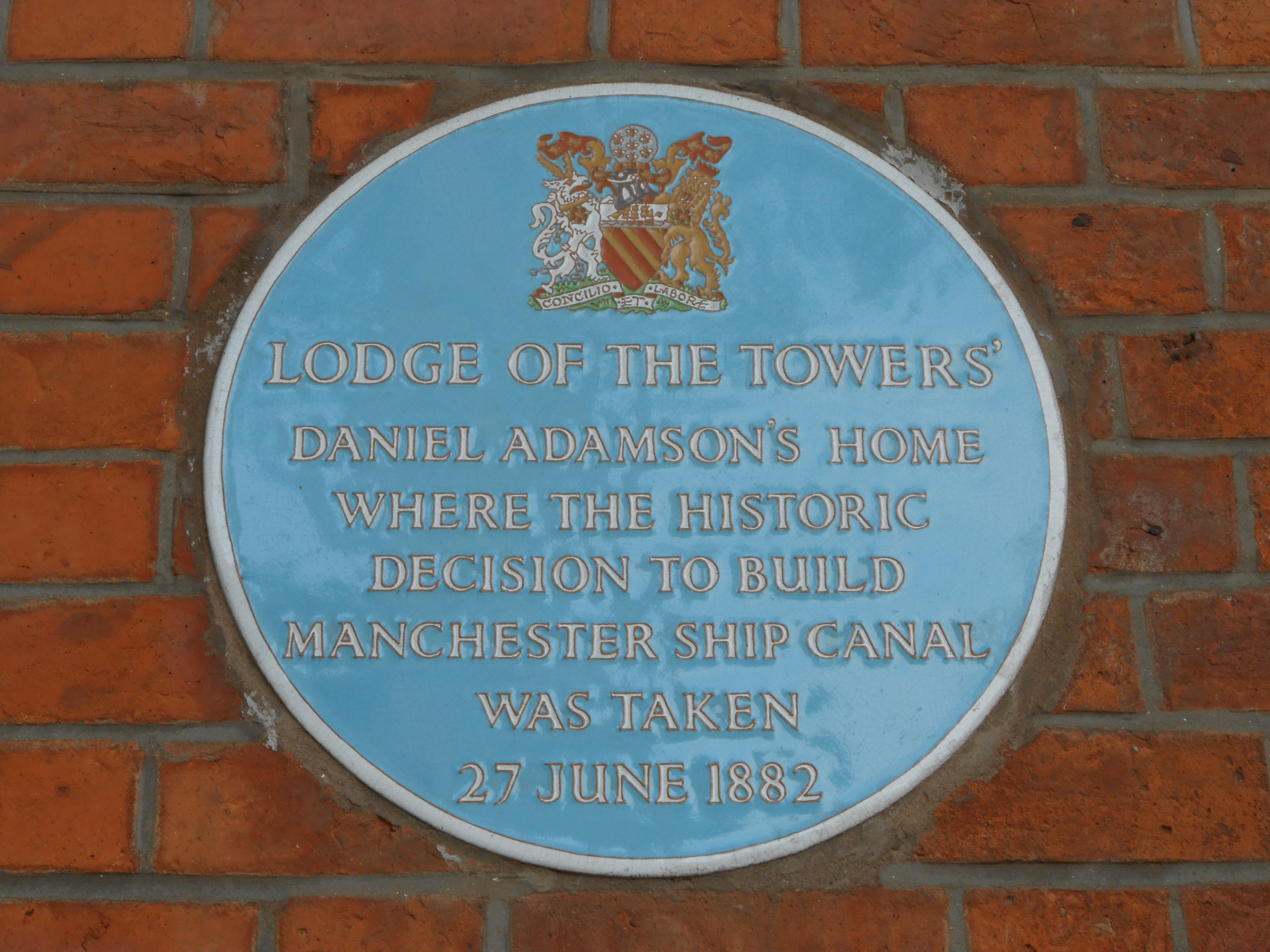
Blue plaque on the Lodge of the Towers commemorating the conception of the Manchester Ship Canal in 1882

The Towers was once the home of the notable engineer Daniel Adamson – whose idea for the canalisation of the Rivers Irwell and Mersey resulted in the creation of the Manchester Ship Canal project, which made the rivers into Manchester navigable for sea-going ships. He invited representatives of several Lancashire towns, local businessmen and politicians, and two civil engineers, Hamilton Fulton and Edward Leader Williams. Fulton proposed a tidal canal, with no locks and a deepened channel into Manchester; Williams was in favour of a series of locks. Both engineers were invited to submit proposals, and Williams' plans were selected to form the basis of a bill submitted to Parliament in November 1882. Due to the intense opposition by Liverpool and the railway companies, the necessary enabling Act of Parliament was not passed until 6 August 1885. Certain conditions were attached: £5 million had to be raised, and the ship canal company had to buy both the Bridgewater Canal and the Mersey & Irwell Navigation within two years.

=== Shirley Institute and BTTG ===
In 1920 it became the headquarters of the Shirley Institute of the British Cotton Industry Research Association, serving as a research centre dedicated to cotton production technologies. A substantial part of the £10,000 purchase price was contributed by William Greenwood, the MP for Stockport, who asked that the building be named after his daughter, Shirley.

On 4 March 1974, The Towers, then known as the Shirley Institute, was designated a Grade II* listed building.

Following later mergers, the institute became part of the British Textile Technology Group (BTTG) in the late 1980s. The BTTG relocated from The Towers to premises in Trafford Park in 2004.

=== Business Park ===
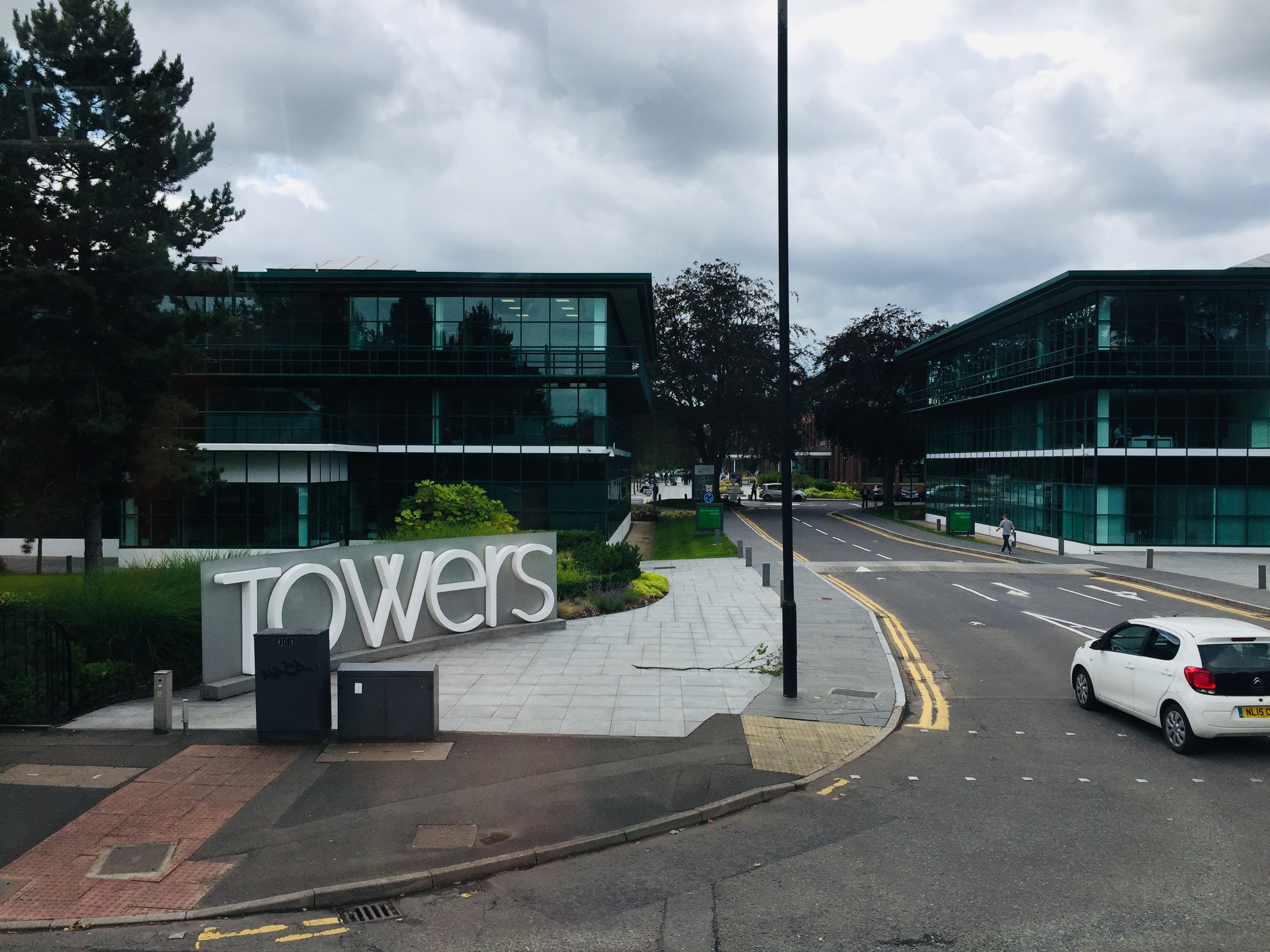
The entrance to the Towers business park

In the early 21st century, the estate land of the Shirley Institute was redeveloped and a new business park was constructed. The mansion house remains in use as office space.

== Architecture ==
The house is constructed of red brick with sandstone detailing and has slate roofs. Its plan is irregular, arranged as two parallel ranges running east–west, with a kitchen attached at the north‑east corner and a gallery at the south‑west corner. It is designed in a French château style and has two main storeys, cellars, attics and a tower. The north front is asymmetrical, with seven bays and chamfered corners, and includes a stone base, floor bands, a parapet, a slender octagonal turret to the left, an octagonal oriel to the right, and a square two‑stage tower above the entrance. All of these features have small slate spire roofs, and the tower has a corbelled cornice. The roof is steeply pitched and hipped, with several tall chimneys and gabled dormers.

The entrance has a porch in a medieval style, with buttresses, a moulded arched opening on marble shafts, and a curved balcony above with small corner turrets. The windows throughout are cross‑windows in stone surrounds, and the dormers have Gothic detailing. The right‑hand oriel is supported on a large moulded base decorated with carved grotesques, with further carved figures at the corners of its cornice. The kitchen, linked at the left end, has a large mullioned window and a steep hipped roof with a ventilator.

The west end is irregular and stepped, and includes a very large stair window that wraps around a corner, and at the south‑west corner a single‑storey gallery with a pyramidal skylight. The south front matches the general style of the north elevation and includes a two‑storey canted bay at the west end and a prominent octagonal turret at the east corner, similar in treatment to the front oriel.

The building was described by Pevsner as "grossly picturesque in red brick and red terra cotta".

=== Associated lodge ===
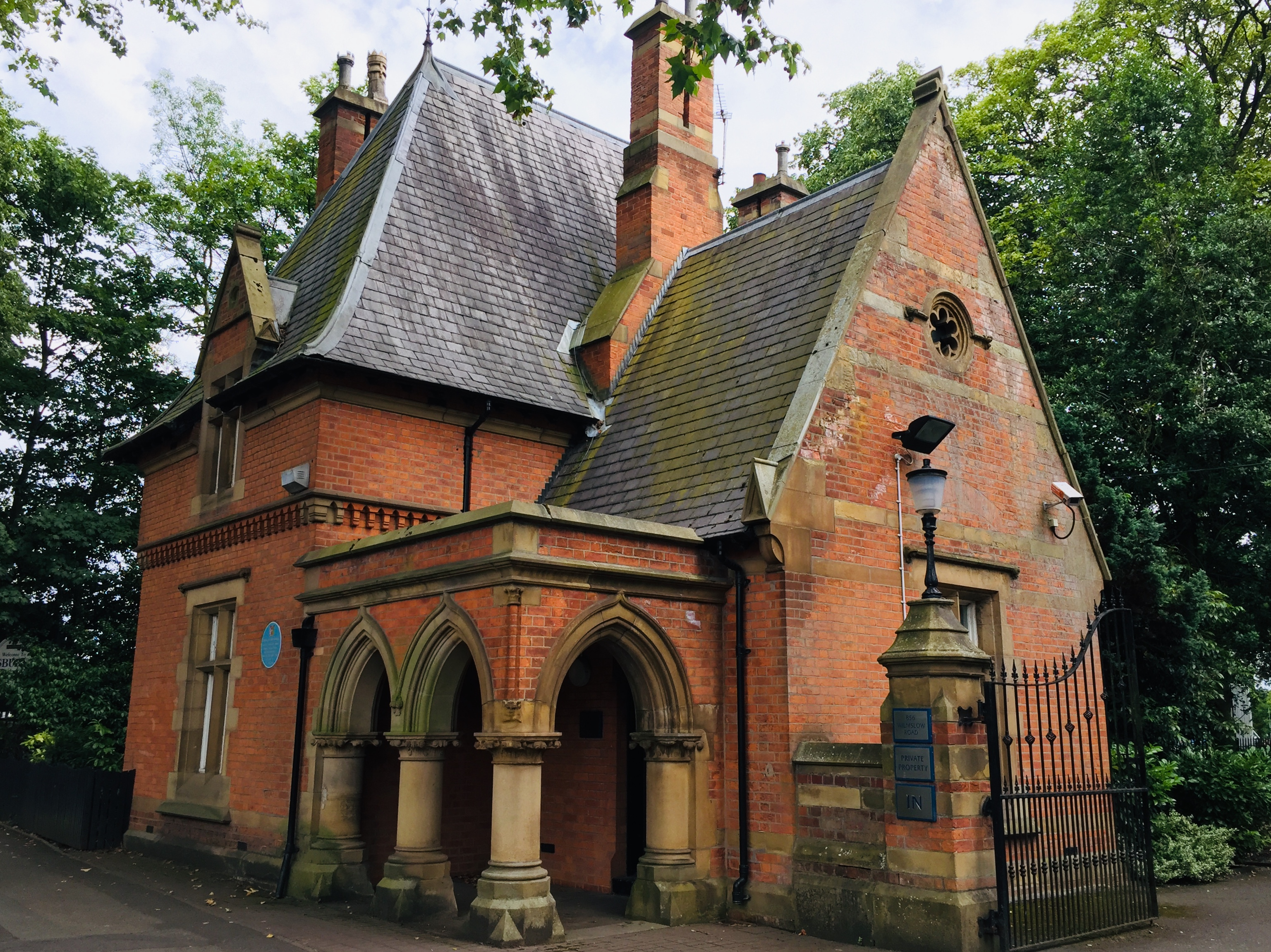
The lodge of The Towers

A lodge to The Towers dating from about 1868–1872 is Grade II listed and was also designed by Worthington. It is constructed of red brick with sandstone detailing and a slate roof. The building has an L‑shaped plan, with a main range running north–south and a shorter wing set back on the west side, with a porch in the angle between them. It is designed in a French Gothic style, with steep roofs and tall chimneys, and has one‑and‑a‑half storeys, the wing being lower.

The porch is open on two sides, with two arches facing the front and one to the side, carried on short, sturdy columns with carved capitals and moulded arched heads, and finished with a parapet. The main range has a brick band carried on brackets, and the upper storey projects slightly. Each floor has a cross‑window, the upper window rising into a small gable that breaks through the eaves, and the roof sweeps down steeply over the walls. There is a tall paired chimney on the side wall and another at the junction with the wing. The wing has a gabled wall with a cross‑window at ground level and a small circular opening near the top. A banded gatepier stands at the north‑west corner, linked to the lodge by a short wall.

== See also ==
- Grade II* listed buildings in Greater Manchester
- Listed buildings in Manchester-M20

== Bibliography ==
- Owen, David (1983). The Manchester Ship Canal. Manchester University Press. ISBN 0-7190-0864-6.
