= NUSSE =

Norwegian electronic computer

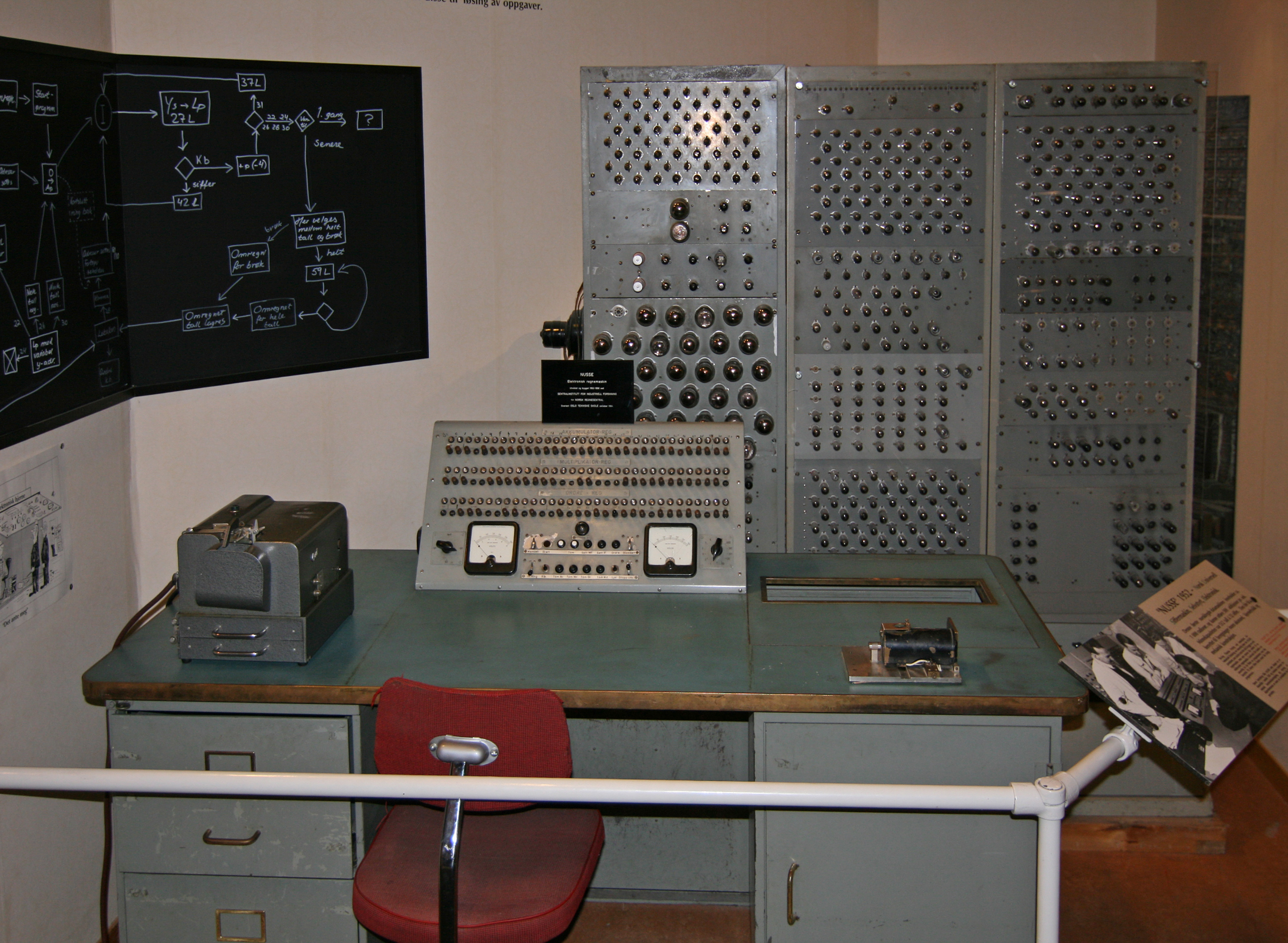
NUSSE at Norsk Teknisk Museum

NUSSE (Norsk Universell Siffermaskin, Sekvensstyrt, Elektronisk) was the first Norwegian electronic computer.

Its development was led by Thomas Hysing at the Central Institute for Industrial Research (SI) in Oslo. It was constructed from 1950 through 1955 and unveiled at the University of Oslo in 1954 to an enthusiastic reception. The machine is considered to have played an important role in developing the commercial use of computers in Norway.

The environment around the NUSSE computer was the birthplace of the AUTOKON CAD/CAM system.

The computer is now on exhibit at the Norwegian Museum of Science and Technology.

== Technical specifications ==
NUSSE used punched tape for input and output and had a 32-bit word length. Its rotating drum memory stored 512 words. Operations took between 1 and 16 milliseconds; the machine could perform about 500 additions per second and consumed 1.5 kW of power.
