= Ronald Rivlin =

Ronald Samuel Rivlin
- Born: May 6, 1915; London, United Kingdom
- Died: October 4, 2005 (aged 90); Palo Alto, California, United States
- Education: Cambridge
- Known for: Finite strain theory Polynomial hyperelastic model Neo-Hookean solid Mooney–Rivlin solid Rivlin–Ericksen tensor
- Awards: Bingham Medal (1958); Timoshenko Medal (1987); Charles Goodyear Medal (1992); Theodore von Karman Medal (1993)
- Scientific career
- Fields: Continuum Mechanics
- Workplaces: BRPRA; Brown University; Lehigh University

Ronald Samuel Rivlin (6 May 1915 in London – 4 October 2005) was a British-American physicist, mathematician, rheologist and a noted expert on rubber.

== Life ==
Rivlin was born in London in 1915. He studied physics and mathematics at St John's College, Cambridge, being awarded a BA in 1937 and a ScD in 1952. He worked for the General Electric Company, then the UK Ministry of Aircraft Production, then the British Rubber Producers Research Association, to which he was recruited to at the suggestion of L. R. G. Treloar by John Wilson, over a “lavish meal” and game of pool. This included one sabbatical year at the National Bureau of Standards, USA. His post at the BRPRA was the start of his interest in rubber.

In 1953, he took up the post of Professor of Applied Mathematics at Brown University, moving to Lehigh University in 1967 to become director of the Center for the Application of Mathematics until his retirement in 1980. He married Violet LoRusso in 1948 (they had a son, John) and became an American citizen in 1955.

== Work ==
His work began with his 1944 observation that "although very little force is required to detach Scotch tape from an adherend, the work expended in doing so is very large". This is from the elastic effects of the adhesive, on which he commented even if "one idealized the adhesive as a perfectly elastic material there appeared to be no body of mathematical theory which would provide a basis for calculations". Existing theories were only on very small deformations, so from 1945 to 1951, Rivlin was one of the creators of the modern theory of large elastic deformations, including theory of Neo-Hookean solids and Mooney-Rivlin solids. He also made major contributions to the theory of non-Newtonian fluid flow, including in the Rivlin-Ericksen expansion.

== Honours and awards ==
- Bingham Medal of the Society of Rheology in 1958.
- Timoshenko Medal of the ASME in 1987
- Charles Goodyear Medal of the American Chemical Society's Rubber Division in 1992.
- von Karman Medal of the American Society of Civil Engineers in 1993
- Member of the National Academy of Engineering
- Member of the American Academy of Arts and Sciences
- President of the Society of Rheology
- Chairman of the Society for Natural Philosophy
- Chairman of the US National Committee for Theoretical and Applied Mechanics
- Chairman, Applied Mechanics Division, ASME

Rivlin was invited to speak in 1972 at the induction of Melvin Mooney into the International Rubber Science Hall of Fame. At first he understood that he was to be inducted, but when he was told that candidates had to be deceased, he said "That's too great a price to pay". It was in 2008 that Rivlin was inducted into the International Rubber Science Hall of Fame (IRSHF) by the Rubber Division of the American Chemical Society.
