= European Conference on Constitutive Models for Rubber =

Scientific conference

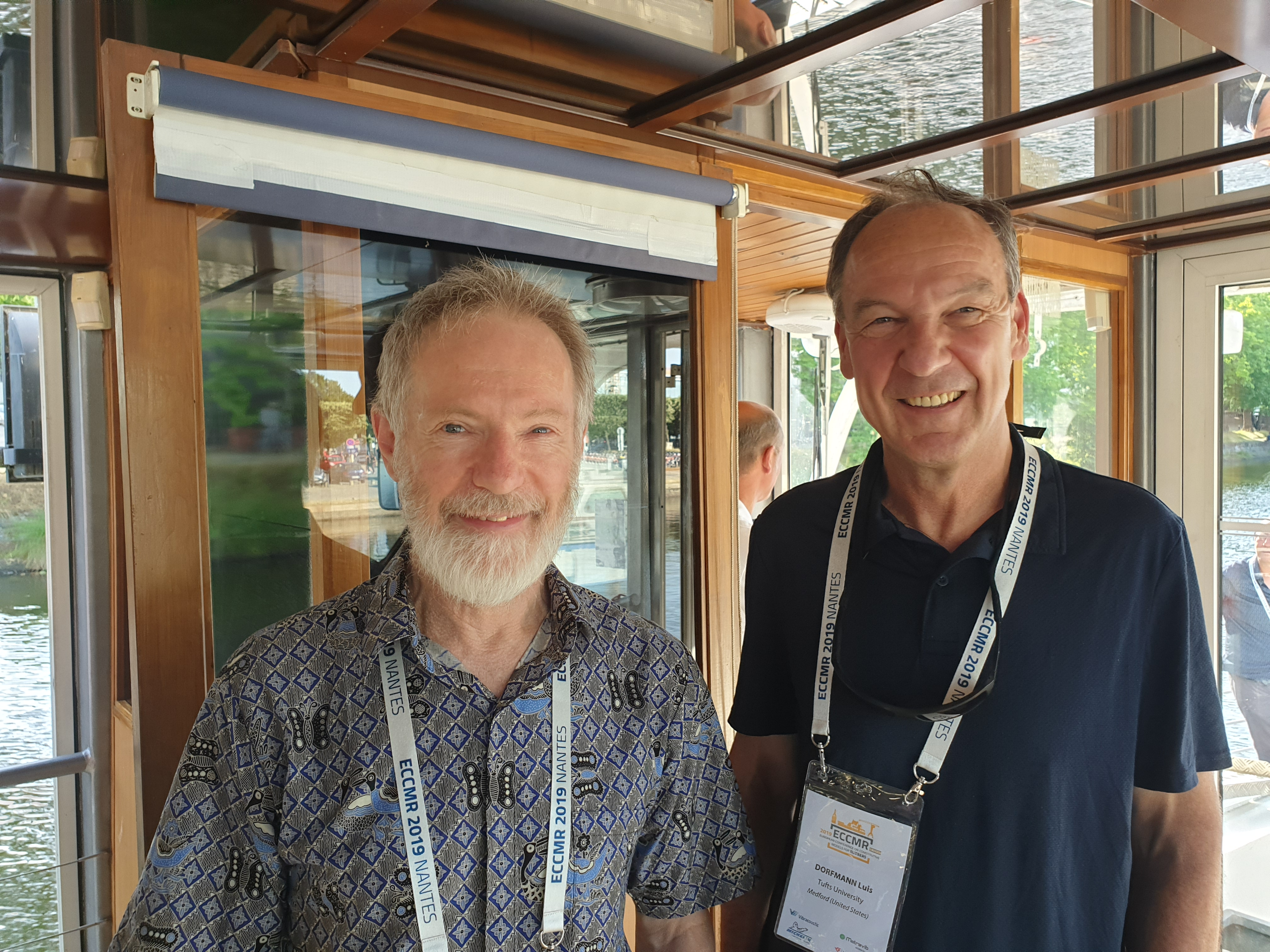
Alan H. Muhr and Luis Dorfmann, founders of ECCMR in 2019 at Nantes, France

The European Conference on Constitutive Models for Rubber (ECCMR) is a biennial scientific conference for researchers working at the intersection of elastomers, testing, and simulation. The conference format includes plenary lectures by leading figures, presentations of original research, and posters. Written papers are published in a conference proceedings.

== History ==
The first conference in the series was organized in 1999 in Vienna when Luis Dorfmann and Alan H. Muhr noticed the need for a forum where developers of finite element analysis software, researchers working on constitutive models for rubber, and other interested parties could exchange and discuss latest developments. Subsequent conferences have been held in Hanover (2001), London (2003), Stockholm (2005), Paris (2007), Dresden (2009), Dublin (2011), San Sebastián (2013), Prague (2015), Munich (2017), Nantes (2019), Milan (2022), Istanbul (2024) and Oxford (2026).

The September 11 attacks in 2001 occurred during the 2nd conference of the series in Hanover, Germany.

Due to the COVID-19 pandemic, the Milan event was delayed by a year, so that although the conference had been held up to that point on odd years, it has been subsequently held on even years.

== Organization ==
The conference is independent of any professional body, and is organized by volunteer researchers from academia and industry. At each conference, a new local organizing committee is appointed to take responsibility for the subsequent conference, with support from a scientific committee with international membership.
