= Andrew Donald Booth =

British computer scientist (1918–2009)

- Booth in 2008
- Born: 11 February 1918; East Molesey, Surrey, England
- Died: 29 November 2009 (aged 91); Sooke, Vancouver Island, British Columbia, Canada
- Education: Jesus College
- Known for: Booth's multiplication algorithm
- Spouse: Kathleen Booth
- Scientific career
- Fields: Computer science, Physics, Electric engineering
- Workplaces: Birkbeck College, University of London, Lakehead University

Andrew Donald Booth (11 February 1918 – 29 November 2009) was a British electrical engineer, physicist and computer scientist who was an early developer of the magnetic drum memory for computers. He is known for Booth's multiplication algorithm. In his later career in Canada he became president of Lakehead University.

== Early life ==
Andrew Donald Booth was born on February 11, 1918, in East Molesy, Surrey, UK. He was the son of Sidney Booth (died 1955) and a cousin of Sir Felix Booth.

He was raised in Weybridge, Surrey, and educated at Haberdashers' Aske's Boys' School. In 1937, he won a scholarship to read mathematics at Jesus College, Cambridge. Booth left Cambridge without taking a degree, having become disaffected with pure mathematics as a subject. He chose an external degree from the University of London instead, which he obtained with a first.

== Career ==
From 1943 to 1945, Booth worked as a mathematical physicist in the X-ray team at the British Rubber Producers' Research Association (BRPRA), Welwyn Garden City, Hertfordshire, gaining his PhD in crystallography from the University of Birmingham in 1944. In 1945, he moved to Birkbeck College, University of London, where his work in the crystallography group led him to build some of the first electronic computers in the United Kingdom including the All Purpose Electronic Computer, first installed at the British Rayon Research Association. Booth founded Birkbeck's department of numerical automation and was named a fellow at the university in 2004. He also did early pioneering work in machine translation.

After World War II, he worked on crystallographic problems research at Birkbeck College and constructed a Fourier synthesis device. He was then introduced to the work of Alan Turing and John von Neumann on logical automata by Douglas Hartree.

The first assembly code in which a language is used to represent machine code instructions is found in Kathleen and Andrew Donald Booth's 1947 work, Coding for A.R.C.. Assembly code is converted into executable machine code by a utility program referred to as an assembler. The term "assembler" is generally attributed to Wilkes, Wheeler and Gill in their 1951 book The Preparation of Programs for an Electronic Digital Computer, who, however, used the term to mean "a program that assembles another program consisting of several sections into a single program". The conversion process is referred to as assembly, as in assembling the source code. The computational step when an assembler is processing a program is called assembly time.

Booth served as President of Lakehead University from 1972 to 1978.

== Personal life ==
Booth married mathematician and computer engineer Kathleen Britten in 1950, and had two children, Amanda and Ian; between 1947 and 1953, together they produced three computing machines.

== See also ==
- Booth's multiplication algorithm

== Bibliography ==
- School of computer science and information systems: A short history (PDF), 50 years of Computing, UK: Birkbeck School of Computing, 2008
- Coding system for the APE(X)C, AU: Murdoch, archived from the original on 7 June 2011.
- Booth, A.D. and Britten, K.H.V. (1947) Coding for A.R.C., Institute for Advanced Study, Princeton
- Booth, A.D. and Britten, K.H.V. (1947) General considerations in the design of an all-purpose electronic digital computer, Institute for Advance Study, Princeton
- Booth, A.D. and Britten, K.H.V. (1948) The accuracy of atomic co-ordinates derived from Fourier series in X-ray crystallography Part V, Proc. Roy. Soc. Vol A 193 pp305–310
- The Electronic Principles of Digital Computers, Electronics Forum (1948);
- Booth, Andrew D; Britten, Kathleen HV (September 1947), "Principles and Progress in the Construction of High-Speed Digital Computers", Quart. Journ. Mech. And Applied Math., 2 (2): 182–197, doi:10.1093/qjmam/2.2.182.
- Booth, A.D (1949) A Magnetic Digital Storage System, Electronic Engineering
- Booth, A.D. (1950) The Physical Realization of An Electronic Digital Computer, Electronic Engineering
- Booth, A.D. (1952) On Optimum Relations Between Circuit Elements and Logical Symbols in the Design of Electronic Calculators, Journal of British Institution of Radio Engineers
- Booth, A.D. and Booth K.H.V. (1953) Automatic Digital Calculators, Butterworth-Heinmann (Academic Press) London
