= Mullins effect =

Feature of rubber's mechanical behavior

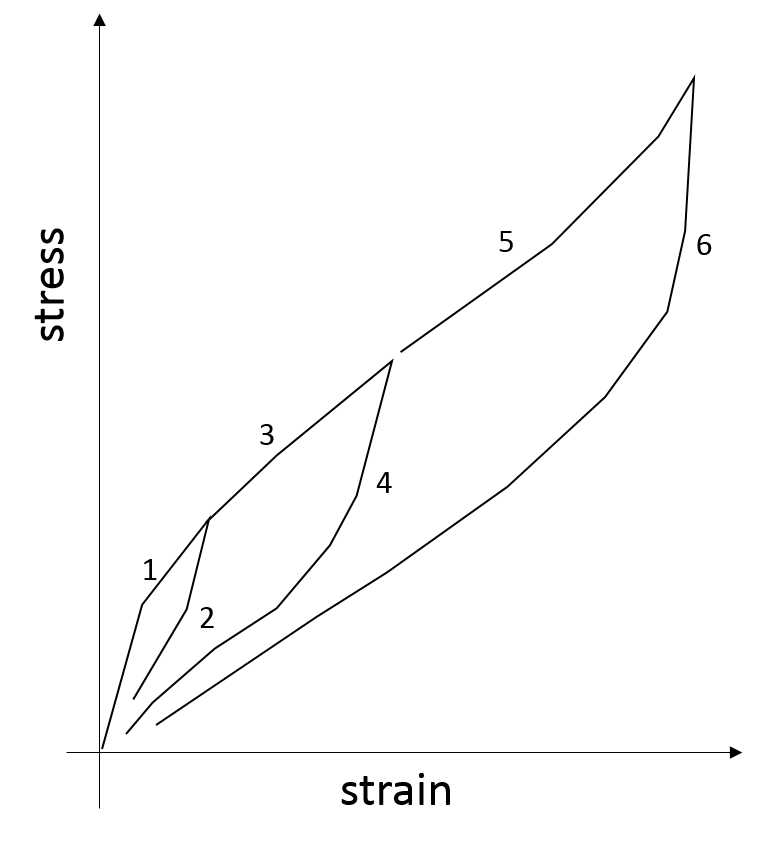
Stress–strain curves for a filled rubber showing progressive cyclic softening, also known as the Mullins effect

The Mullins effect is a particular aspect of the mechanical response in filled rubbers, in which the stress–strain curve depends on the maximum loading previously encountered. The phenomenon, named for rubber scientist Leonard Mullins, working at the Tun Abdul Razak Research Centre in Hertford, can be idealized for many purposes as an instantaneous and irreversible softening of the stress–strain curve that occurs whenever the load increases beyond its prior all-time maximum value. At times, when the load is less than a prior maximum, nonlinear elastic behavior prevails. The effect should not be confused with the Payne effect.

Although the term "Mullins effect" is commonly applied to stress softening in filled rubbers, the phenomenon is common to all rubbers, including "gums" (rubber lacking filler). As first shown by Mullins and coworkers, the retraction stresses of an elastomer are independent of carbon black when the stress at the maximum strain is constant. Mullins softening is a viscoelastic effect, although in filled rubber there can be additional contributions to the mechanical hysteresis from filler particles debonding from each other or from the polymer chains.

A number of constitutive models have been proposed to describe the effect. For example, the Ogden-Roxburgh model is used in several commercial finite element codes.

== See also ==
- Payne effect
