= British Rayon Research Association =

UK-based research institute

The British Rayon Research Association was a research institute formed in 1946 by the British Rayon Federation and others. It was funded by the Department of Scientific and Industrial Research and by voluntary funds from industry to investigate the chemical and physical properties of rayon and rayon fabrics, using a wide range of laboratory and theoretical methods. John Wilson, who was its Director from 1948 to 1958 was appointed a CBE for his work at the BRRA. It was located near Ringway Airport in Manchester, initially, and then at Heald Green near Manchester after 1955.

Work from the Association included academic publication, that included papers by Leslie Treloar in the journal Polymer. The BRRA sponsored Andrew Donald Booth's early research into computing at Birkbeck and was home to the first of his All Purpose Electronic Computers built in 1952

Under Wilson's leadership, the staff of BRRA grew to nearly 300 and gained an international reputation in textiles research. The BRRA also offered annual Technological Scholarships in the Departments of Textiles at the University of Manchester and the University of Leeds.

The Duke of Edinburgh opened the new BRRA laboratory at Heald Green on 11 May 1955. It cost £500,000. British Pathé filmed footage of research, at BRRA, on the strength of fabrics.

John Wilson was succeeded by Leonard Albert Wiseman in 1958.

== Merger with Cotton Research Association ==
By at least 1955 it was apparent that there was potential for overlap in research with the work of the British Cotton Industry Research Association. In 1957 an official agreement was made to avoid duplication.

Wilson retired from the BRRA in 1958, and Len Wiseman became Director.

Consensus emerged that a merger between the BCIRA and BRRA was needed. BRRA's life ended with its merger with the BCRA to form the Cotton, Silk, and Man-Made Fibres Research Association in 1961, better known as the Shirley Institute. Len Wiseman was appointed its Deputy Director.

== Notable employees ==
- LRG Treloar, author of texts and papers on polymer science
- George Porter later Baron Porter of Luddenham, Fullerian Professor of Chemistry at the Royal Institution, and Nobel Laureate,
- John Wilson
- Derek Saunders, later Pro-Vice Chancellor of Cranfield Institute of Technology
- Robin Bullough
- Arthur S. Lodge, rheologist, later at University of Wisconsin
- Leonard Albert Wiseman

== Publications and articles by the BRRA and staff ==
- Application of high-speed photography to textile problems, G. A. J. Orchard, R. A. Barker, British Rayon Research Association
- The physics of rubber elasticity, L. R. G. Treloar Clarendon Press, 1958
