= Alan G. Thomas (scientist) =

- Born: 1927; United Kingdom
- Died: 23 April 2019 (aged 91–92)
- Education: Oxford
- Known for: Fracture Mechanics, Rubber
- Awards: Charles Goodyear Medal (1994); Colwyn medal (1978)
- Scientific career
- Fields: Polymer Science
- Workplaces: BRPRA, Queen Mary University of London

Alan G. Thomas (1927-2019) was an international authority on the mechanics of rubbery materials, in particular their fracture mechanics properties. Along with Ronald S. Rivlin, he published the Rupture of Rubber series of articles, beginning in 1953. He was the first to apply Griffith's energy release rate criterion to the analysis of rubber's strength and fatigue behavior.

Thomas attend Brasenose College, Oxford to study physics, graduating in 1948. He then accepted a position at the British Rubber Producer's Research Association. His research director was Dr Ronald S. Rivlin, who suggested that he study the strength of rubber.

He developed the theories of strength and crack growth in rubber, starting from the work of Alan Arnold Griffith. He demonstrated that Griffith's strain energy release rate provided a useful way to characterize the conditions at a crack tip, a problem that previously had been thought intractable due to the finite straining and nonlinearly elastic stress-strain behavior of rubber.

Thomas has been recognised with many prizes and medals. Most notable of these are the 1978 Colwyn medal of the Institute of Materials Minerals and Mining and the 1994 Charles Goodyear Medal of the American Chemical Society. His employers MRPRA, received the Prince Philip award in 1990 for his pioneering work on earthquake bearings.

He was a visiting professor in the Materials Department at Queen Mary University of London since 1975.

Prof Alan Thomas died in his sleep on 23 April 2019.
