= Dynamic similarity (Reynolds and Womersley numbers) =

In fluid mechanics, dynamic similarity is the phenomenon that when there are two geometrically similar vessels (same shape, different sizes) with the same boundary conditions (e.g., no-slip, center-line velocity) and the same Reynolds and Womersley numbers, then the fluid flows will be identical. This can be seen from inspection of the underlying Navier-Stokes equation, with geometrically similar bodies, equal Reynolds and Womersley Numbers the functions of velocity (u’,v’,w’) and pressure (P’) for any variation of flow.

== Derivation ==
The Reynolds number and the Womersley number are the only two physical parameters necessary to solve an incompressible fluid flow problem. The Reynolds number is given by:

$$N_R = \tfrac{VL \rho}{\mu}.\,\!$$

The terms of the equation itself represent the following:

$$N_R = {\text{Convective Inertial Force}\over \text{Shear Force}}.\,\!$$.

When the Reynolds number is large, it shows that the flow is dominated by convective inertial effects; When the Reynolds Number is small, it shows that the flow is dominated by shear effects. The Womersley number is given by:

$$N_W = L\sqrt{\tfrac{\omega\rho}{\mu}}=\sqrt{N_S}\,\!$$,

which is simply the square-root of the Stokes Number; the terms of the equation itself represent the following:

$$N_W = {\text{Transient Inertial Force}\over \text{Shear Force}}.\,\!$$.

When the Womersley number is large (around 10 or greater), it shows that the flow is dominated by oscillatory inertial forces and that the velocity profile is flat. When the Womersley parameter is low, viscous forces tend to dominate the flow, velocity profiles are parabolic in shape, and the center-line velocity oscillates in phase with the driving pressure gradient.

Starting with Navier–Stokes equation for Cartesian flow:

$${\rho} \left (\frac{{\partial}u}{{\partial}t}+u\frac{{\partial}u}{{\partial}x}+v\frac{{\partial}u}{{\partial}y}+w\frac{{\partial}u}{{\partial}z}\right )= {\rho}g-\frac{{\partial}P}{{\partial}x}+{\mu}\left( \frac{{\partial^2}u}{{\partial}x^2}+\frac{{\partial^2}v}{{\partial}y^2}+\frac{{\partial^2}w}{{\partial}z^2}\right).\,\!$$.

The terms of the equation itself represent the following:

transient inertial forces + convective inertial forces=gravitational force + Pressure force + viscous forces.[3]

Ignoring gravitational forces and dividing the equation by density ($\rho$) yields:

$$\left (\frac{{\partial}u}{{\partial}t}+u\frac{{\partial}u}{{\partial}x}+v\frac{{\partial}u}{{\partial}y}+w\frac{{\partial}u}{{\partial}z}\right )= -\frac{1}{\rho}\frac{{\partial}P}{{\partial}x}+{\nu}\left( \frac{{\partial^2}u}{{\partial}x^2}+\frac{{\partial^2}v}{{\partial}y^2}+\frac{{\partial^2}w}{{\partial}z^2}\right),\,\!$$,

where $\nu={\mu}/{\rho}$ is the kinematic viscosity. Since both the Reynolds and Womersley numbers are dimensionless, Navier-Stokes must be represented as a dimensionless expression as well. Choosing $V$, $\omega$, and $L$ as a characteristic velocity, frequency, and length respectively yields dimensionless variables: Dimensionless Length Term (same for y' and z'):$x' = {x / L}\,\!$, Dimensionless Velocity Term (same for v' and w'): $u' = {u / V}\,\!$, Dimensionless Pressure Term: $P' = {P / {{\rho}V^2}}\,\!$, Dimensionless Time Term: $t' = t{\omega}\,\!$. Dividing the Navier-Stokes equation by $\tfrac{V^2}{L}\,\!$ (Convective Inertial Force term) gives:

$$\frac{{N_W}^2}{N_R} \left (\frac{{\partial}u'}{{\partial}t'}\right)+\left (u'\frac{{\partial}u'}{{\partial}x'}+v'\frac{{\partial}u'}{{\partial}y'}+w'\frac{{\partial}u'}{{\partial}z'}\right )= -\frac{{\partial}P'}{{\partial}x'}+\frac{1}{N_R}\left( \frac{{\partial^2}u'}{{\partial}x'^2}+\frac{{\partial^2}v'}{{\partial}y'^2}+\frac{{\partial^2}w'}{{\partial}z'^2}\right)\,\!$$,

With the addition of the dimensionless continuity equation (seen below) in any incompressible fluid flow problem the Reynolds and Womersley numbers are the only two physical parameters that are in the two equations:

$\frac{{\partial}u'}{{\partial}x'}+\frac{{\partial}v'}{{\partial}y'}+\frac{{\partial}w'}{{\partial}z'}=0. \,\!$,

== Boundary layer thickness ==
The Reynolds and Womersley Numbers are also used to calculate the thicknesses of the boundary layers that can form from the fluid flow’s viscous effects. The Reynolds number is used to calculate the convective inertial boundary layer thickness that can form, and the Womersley number is used to calculate the transient inertial boundary thickness that can form. From the Womersley number it can be shown that the transient inertia force is represented by ${\rho}{\omega}V\,\!$, and from the last term in the non-modified Navier-Stokes equation that viscous force is represented by $\tfrac{\mu V}{\delta_1^2}\,\!$ (subscript one indicates that the boundary layer thickness is that of the transient boundary layer). Setting the two forces equal to each other yields: ${\rho}{\omega}V=\tfrac{\mu V}{\delta_1^2}\,\!$ Solving for ${\delta}_1\,\!$ yields: ${\delta}_1=\sqrt{\tfrac{\mu}{\rho\omega}}\,\!$ Adding a characteristic length (L) to both sides gives the ratio: $\tfrac{L}{\delta_1}=L\sqrt{\tfrac{\rho\omega}{\mu}} =L\sqrt{\tfrac{\omega}{\nu}}=N_W \,\!$ Therefore, it can be seen that when the flow has a high Womersley Number the transient boundary layer thickness is very small, when compared to the characteristic length, which for circular vessels is the radius. As shown earlier the convective inertial force is represented by the term $\tfrac{{\rho}{V^2}}{L}\,\!$; equating that to the viscous force term yields: $\tfrac{{\rho}{V^2}}{L}=\tfrac{{\mu}{V}}{{\delta_2^2}}.\,\!$ Solving for the convective boundary layer thickness yields: ${\delta}_2=\sqrt{\tfrac{\mu L}{\rho V}}.\,\!$ Factoring in a characteristic length gives the ratio: $\tfrac{L}{\delta_2}=\sqrt{\tfrac{\rho VL}{\mu}} =\sqrt{\tfrac{VL}{\nu}}=\sqrt{N_R}. \,\!$ From the equation it is shown that for a flow with a large Reynolds Number there will be a correspondingly small convective boundary layer compared to the vessel’s characteristic length. By knowing the Reynolds and Womersley numbers for a given flow it is possible to calculate both the transient and the convective boundary layer thicknesses, and relate them to a flow in another system. The boundary layer thickness is also useful in knowing when the fluid can be treated as an ideal fluid. This is at a distance that is larger than both boundary layer thicknesses.

== See also ==
- Similitude
- Dimensionless Number
