= Kinematic similarity =

In fluid mechanics, kinematic similarity is described as “the velocity at any point in the model flow is proportional by a constant scale factor to the velocity at the same point in the prototype flow, while it is maintaining the flow’s streamline shape.” Kinematic Similarity is one of the three essential conditions (Geometric Similarity, Dynamic Similarity and Kinematic Similarity) to complete the similarities between a model and a prototype. The kinematic similarity is the similarity of the motion of the fluid. Since motions can be expressed with distance and time, it implies the similarity of lengths (i.e. geometrical similarity) and, in addition, a similarity of the time interval. To achieve kinematic similarity in a scaled model, dimensionless numbers in fluid dynamics come into consideration. For example, Reynolds number of the model and the prototype must match. There are other dimensionless numbers that will also come into consideration, such as Womersley number

== Example ==
Assume we need to make a scaled up model of coronary artery with kinematic similarity.

Parameter	Variable	Value	Unit
Coronary Artery Diameter	D_{1}	3	mm
Model Artery Diameter	D_{2}	30	mm
Velocity in Artery	v_{1}	15	cm/s
Kinematic Viscosity (Blood)	ʋ_{1}	3.2	cP

Reynolds Number,
Re = ρvl/μ = vl/ʋ

Where,
ρ = Density of the fluid (SI units: kg/m^{3})
v = Velocity of the fluid (SI units: m/s)
l = Characteristic length or diameter (SI units: m)
μ = Dynamic viscosity (SI units: N s/m^{2})
ʋ = Kinematic viscosity (SI units: m^{2}/s)

There are few ways to maintain kinematic similarity. To keep the Reynolds number the same, the scaled-up model can use a different fluid with different viscosity or density. We can also change the velocity of the fluid to maintain the same dynamic characteristics.

The above equation can be written for artery as, Re (artery) = ρ_{1}v_{1}l_{1}/μ_{1} = v_{1}l_{1}/ʋ_{1}

And for the scaled-up model, Re (model) = ρ_{2}v_{2}l_{2}/μ_{2} = v_{2}l_{2}/ʋ_{2}

At the condition of Kinematic Similarity, Re (model) = Re (artery)

That means, ρ_{1}v_{1}l_{1}/μ_{1} = ρ_{2}v_{2}l_{2}/μ_{2}

or, v_{1}l_{1}/ʋ_{1} = v_{2}l_{2}/ʋ_{2}

Substituting variables by provided values will provide important characteristics data for the fluid and flow characteristics for the scaled-up model. A similar approach can be taken for the scaled-down model (i.e. oil refinery scaled-down model) as well.

== See also ==
- Similitude (model)
- Similarity (geometry)
- Dynamic similarity (Reynolds and Womersley numbers)
- Dimensionless Number
- Reynolds number
- Womersley number
