= Compressor map =

Chart showing compressor performance

A compressor map is a chart which shows the performance of a turbomachinery compressor. This type of compressor is used in gas turbine engines, for supercharging reciprocating engines and for industrial processes, where it is known as a dynamic compressor. A map is created from compressor rig test results or predicted by a special computer program. Alternatively the map of a similar compressor can be suitably scaled. This article is an overview of compressor maps and their different applications and also has detailed explanations of maps for a fan and intermediate and high-pressure compressors from a three-shaft aero-engine as specific examples.

Compressor maps are an integral part of predicting the performance of gas turbine and turbocharged engines, both at design and off-design conditions. They also serve a critical purpose in selecting the correct compressors for industrial processes.

Fans and turbines also have operating maps, although the latter are significantly different in appearance to that of compressors.

== Compressor design ==
A compressor map shows the operating range of a compressor and how well it works within its operating range. Two fundamental requirements for the gas flowing through a compressor explain why it works best at a design condition and not so well at other conditions, known as off-design. First, the exit area has to be smaller than the inlet area because the compressed gas has a higher density. The exit area is sized to pass the specific volume at the design condition. Second, all the rotor and stator blades in an axial compressor, and impeller inducer and diffuser vanes in a centrifugal compressor, are angled to meet approaching air head-on at the design condition to minimize incidence losses. Incidence losses reduce the efficiency of compression. Satisfactory operation of the compressor relies on controlling the angle at which the gas approaches rotating and stationary blades to within an acceptable range. Deviating from the optimum first results in increased losses/reduced efficiency then either stalling or sonic velocity/choking which occur in the blade passages at opposite ends of an axial compressor at the same time. They also occur in a centrifugal compressor at entry to the impeller and in the diffuser.

The compressor design point will be in an area of high efficiency whether the compressor is part of a gas turbine engine or whether it is used for pumping air into a blast furnace. However the compressor has to provide suitable performance at other operating conditions imposed on it which means a high efficiency is required over a wider range of operation. In the case of a gas turbine engine it must permit the engine to be started readily and accelerated rapidly to the design speed which means operating at lower speeds than the design speed. At speeds and flows away from the design point the compressor flow area reduction is not appropriate for the actual density rise. Figure 14 in a NACA report illustrates pictorially the difference in contraction required at the design condition and at low speed. At lower speeds, for example, the gas hasn't been compressed enough to exit the compressor without adversely affecting the blade angles of attack through the compressor. Away from the design point the middle stages of an axial compressor continue to operate at about the optimum angle of attack but the front stages deviate one way, towards stall, and the rear stages in the opposite direction towards choke. The deviation was acceptable up to a design pressure ratio of about 5:1, producing only a loss in efficiency. At higher design pressure ratios prevention of rotating stall, which occurs at low corrected speeds, and choking was required with the introduction of inlet guide vanes which partially closed at low speeds, or by removing air part-way along the compressor at low speeds. Rows of variable stators or split compressors, which allowed the front stages to speed up and the rear to slow down relative to each other, would also be introduced for the same reason. When pressure ratios reached about 12:1 compressors would incorporate more than one of these features together.

=== Fixes for rotating stall ===
Early examples of different solutions to alleviate rotating stall in the front stages include the Rolls-Royce Avon with variable inlet guide vanes and interstage bleed, the General Electric J79 with variable inlet guide vanes and variable stators, the Bristol Olympus with split compressor and the Pratt & Whitney J57 with split compressor and intercompressor bleed. Compressor bleed up to this point had been only necessary for starting and accelerating beyond low corrected speeds where its loss to thrust production, from dumping overboard, was not important.

A further development was permanent compressor bleed routed back into the engine where it contributed to thrust. The Rolls-Royce Conway had a split compressor with intercompressor bleed to the jetpipe. A split compressor with this bypass arrangement allowed the highest pressure ratio of any Rolls-Royce engine, at that time, without the need for variable inlet guide vanes or interstage bleed. It was better known as an arrangement for better propulsive efficiency, a bypass engine. The Pratt & Whitney J58 used interstage overboard bleed for starting and accelerating through low corrected speeds but since it returned to these speeds at high mach numbers the bleed was opened again but this time routed to the jetpipe where it cooled the afterburner and nozzle. This cooling contributed indirectly to thrust in allowing more fuel to be burned in the afterburner. A similar arrangement, but using a split compressor with intercompressor bleed to the jetpipe, was later known as a 'leaky' turbojet, a bypass engine with only enough bypass for cooling the afterburner and nozzle.

== Compressor map ==
Compressors pump gas for a wide variety of applications each of which has its own flow resistance which the compressor has to meet to keep the gas flowing. A map shows the pumping characteristics for the complete range of flows and pressure requirements for its application. The map may be produced by driving the compressor with an electric motor with the flow resistance selected artificially using a variable area throttle valve. The compressor may also be mapped if it is part of a gas generator with a valve at the turbine exit. Campbell shows a General Electric J79 compressor mapped in this way.

=== Dimensional analysis ===
Compressor performance changes, day to day, with changes in the ambient pressure and temperature. Woolenweber shows the change in performance of a turbocharger compressor when the inlet temperature varies between 70 and 100 °F. In the case of aircraft compressors, inlet pressure and temperature also change with altitude and airspeed. The presentation of different performance for every combination of inlet temperature and pressure would be unmanageable but it is possible to collapse it all onto a single map, which is applicable to a wide range of inlet conditions, using dimensional analysis. In dimensional analysis individual quantities such as rotor speed, mass flow and delivery pressure are each grouped with other relevant quantities in such a way that the groups have no dimensions but still have a physical meaning. For example rotor speed $N$, inlet temperature $T$, compressor diameter $D$ and gas properties $\gamma$ and $R$ are grouped together as dimensionless $ND/\sqrt{\gamma RT}$ which is equivalent to the blade mach number.

Parameter groups which are used as the basis for gas turbine engine compressor maps are total-pressure ratio (P_{exit}/P_{inlet}), $w\sqrt{\gamma RT}/{AP}$, $ND/\sqrt{\gamma RT}$ and efficiency. $ND/\sqrt{\gamma RT}$, for example, is simplified below while still being representative of mach number. Maps for other applications use head or discharge pressure and volume flow.

For a particular compressor and gas the flow and speed groups are simplified, by deleting the terms which are constant for a particular compressor and application, namely compressor dimensions and gas properties $D$, $A$, $R$ and γ. They are named pseudo-non-dimensional parameters $w\sqrt{T}/{P}$ and $N/\sqrt{T}$.

A final step is to give the pseudo-non-dimensional parameters standard units for mass flow and speed and more recognizable numerical values by applying pressure and temperature ratio correction factors, also derived as part of the dimensional analysis.

The corrected parameters are $w\sqrt{\theta}/\delta$ and $N/\sqrt{\theta}$. They have the same units as the original observed values and are corrected to agreed standard conditions, the International Standard Atmosphere at sea level (ISA SL). Alternatively they may be shown relative to the design value where the design value is specified as either 100% or 1.0.

The fuel burned in a gas turbine engine sets the compressor running line and also has to be used in "non-dimensional" form to show its effect on engine operation. It is used as a ratio with combustor pressure when shown on a compressor map. Corrected fuel flow is shown as $w_\text{fuel} = w/\sqrt{\theta}\,\delta.$ Although both air and fuel are flows of fluid, their non-dimensional parameters are different, $w\sqrt{\theta}/\delta$ and $w/\sqrt{\theta}\,\delta$, because non-dimensional airflow is a form of fluid Mach number, while fuel is flow of an incompressible energy source. The dimensions of airflow are M/t, and those of fuel-flow are ML^{2}/t^{3}, where M, L and t are mass, length and time.

Fuel flow is also shown on a compressor map, but in the form of its effect, i.e. turbine inlet temperature. This effect is shown, again non-dimensionally, as the ratio of turbine inlet temperature to compressor inlet temperature, and known as engine temperature ratio. Grandcoing shows the constant temperature lines crossed as a helicopter compressor goes from no-load to full-load with increasing fuel flow.

=== Correcting observed or measured values to standard day conditions ===
From the equality of the flow parameters on two different days $(w\sqrt{T}/{P})$_{day 1}$=$ $(w\sqrt{T}/{P})$_{day 2}, measured values on one day can be corrected to those that would be measured on a standard day so,

$w$_{corr} $= w\sqrt{T/519}/(P/14.7)$ where $w, T, P$ are measured values and 519 degR and 14.7lb/sq in are the standard day temperature and pressure.

The temperature and pressure correction factors are $\theta$ and $\delta$, so $w$_{corr} $=$ $w\sqrt{\theta}/{\delta}$

For speed the corrected value is $N$_{corr} $=$ $N/\sqrt{\theta}$

Example: An engine is running at 100% speed and 107 lb of air is entering the compressor every second, and the day conditions are 14.5 psia and 30 deg F (490 deg R).

On a standard day the airflow would be $= 107\sqrt{490/519}/(14.5/14.7)$ which is 105.2 lb/sec. The speed would be $= 100/\sqrt{490/519}$ which is 103%. These corrected values are what would appear on the compressor map for this particular engine.

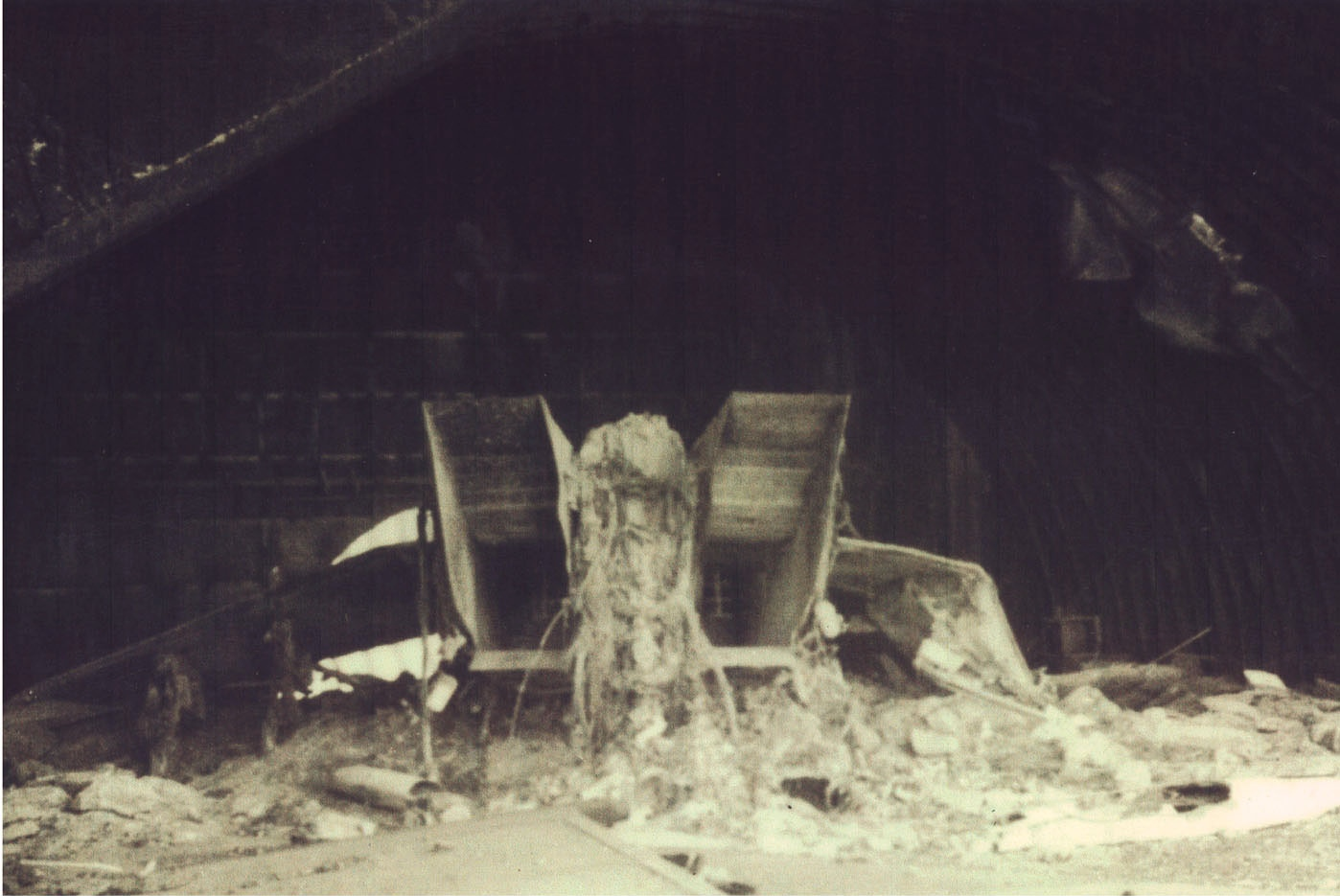
MIG-25 Spray mast for water/methanol pre-compressor cooling visible in port intake

This example shows that a compressor runs aerodynamically faster on a 'cold' day and would be slower on a 'hot' day. Since the 'day' conditions are those at entry to the compressor an extremely 'hot' day is produced artificially by the ram temperature rise at high Mach numbers. The aerodynamic speed is low enough, despite the engine running at its 100% rated mechanical speed, to get into the rotating stall region on the map so an engine operating at these Mach numbers needs the appropriate features. The General Electric J93 had variable inlet guide vanes and stators. The Pratt & Whitney J58 had inter-stage bleed from the compressor and 2-position inlet guide vanes. The Tumansky R-15 had pre-compressor cooling to reduce the air temperature and avoid low corrected speeds.

=== Kinematic similarity ===
The basis for using corrected parameters on the map is mach number kinematic similarity. Corrected flow and speed define mach numbers through the compressor and flow angles onto the blades using velocity triangles. Velocity triangles allow flows to be transferred between different reference frames. In this case gas velocity and circumferential blade velocity in a stationary frame is converted to velocity in a rotating frame (rotor) passage. Losses in blade and vane rows depend primarily on incidence angles and mach number. A particular operating point on the map determines the mach numbers and flow angles everywhere in the compressor.

=== Flight at high Mach numbers ===
A historical example, the Pratt & Whitney J58, illustrates the significance of using corrected values. Rotating stall occurs at low corrected speeds so occurs during starting and also above idle. It may be relieved by opening a bleed valve to increase airflow. At very high flight speeds the compressor will return to this low corrected speed area so the same operating point occurs at low rotational speed on the ground and maximum rotational speed at mach 3 at high altitude. The stalling, low efficiency, blade vibration and failure that plagued low corrected speeds on the ground has returned at 100% rotor rpm at mach 3. The same operating point on the map has the same axial and peripheral mach numbers, same velocity triangles, same efficiency despite the actual rotor speed and compressor inlet temperature being 4750 RPM/60 °F on the ground and 7,000 RPM/over 600 °F at Mach 3. The same corrected operating point required the same solution to prevent stalling and increase efficiency which was to bleed air from the 4th compressor stage.

=== Operating boundaries ===
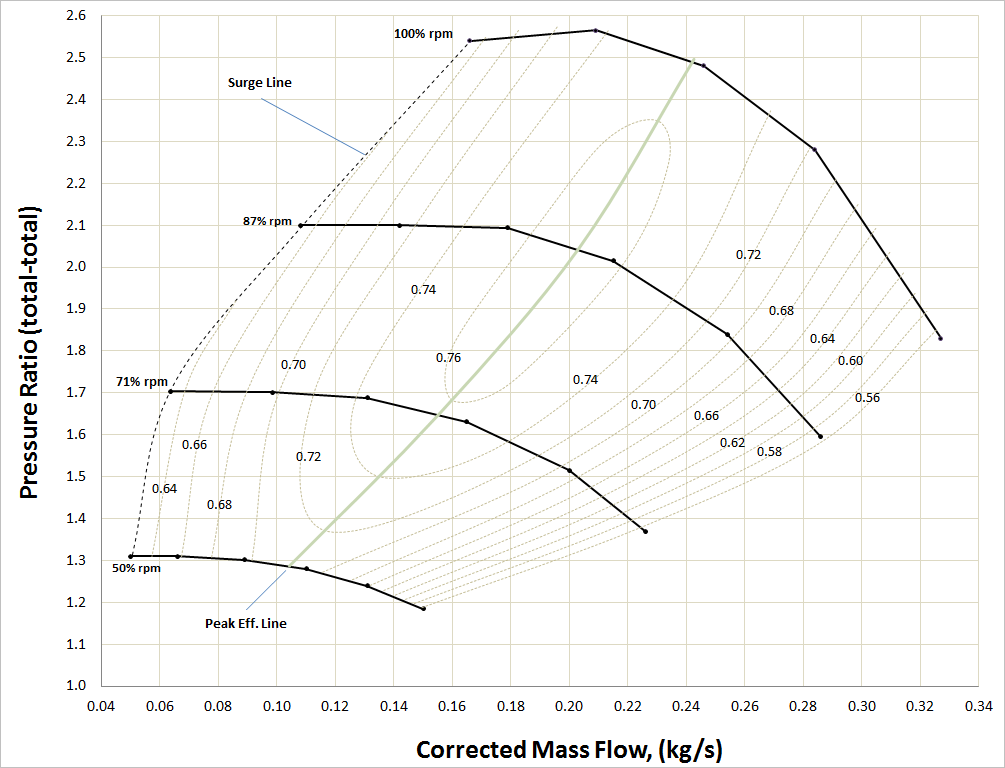
Example centrifugal compressor performance map

The compressor has operating boundaries at the flow extremes for a particular speed which are caused by different phenomena. The steepness of the high flow part of a constant speed line is due to the effects of compressibility. The position of the other end of the line is located by blade or passage flow separation. There is a well-defined, low-flow boundary marked on the map as a stall or surge line, at which blade stall occurs due to positive incidence separation. Not marked as such on maps for turbochargers and gas turbine engines is a more gradually approached, high-flow boundary at which passages choke when the gas velocity reaches the speed of sound. This boundary is identified for industrial compressors as overload, choke, sonic or stonewall. The approach to this flow limit is indicated by the speed lines becoming more vertical. Other areas of the map are regions where fluctuating vane stalling may interact with blade structural modes leading to failure, ie rotating stall causing metal fatigue.

== Operating ranges for different applications ==
Different applications move over their particular map along different paths. An example map with no operating lines is shown as a pictorial reference with the stall/surge line on the left and the steepening speed lines towards choke and overload on the right.

Maps have similar features and general shape because they all apply to machines with spinning vanes which use similar principles for pumping a compressible fluid. Not all machines have stationary vanes (centrifugal compressors may have either vaned or vaneless diffusers). However a compressor operating as part of a gas turbine or turbocharged engine behaves differently to an industrial compressor because its flow and pressure characteristics have to match those of its driving turbine and other engine components, such as power turbine or jet nozzle for a gas turbine, and, for a turbocharger the engine airflow which depends on engine speed and charge pressure. A link between a gas turbine compressor and its engine can be shown with lines of constant engine temperature ratio, ie the effect of fuelling/increased turbine temperature which raises the running line as the temperature ratio increases.

One manifestation of different behaviour appears in the choke region on the right-hand side of a map. It is a no-load condition in a gas turbine, turbocharger or industrial axial compressor but overload in an industrial centrifugal compressor. Hiereth et al. shows a turbocharger compressor full-load, or maximum fuelling, curve runs up close to the surge line. A gas turbine compressor full-load line also runs close to the surge line. The industrial compressor overload is a capacity limit and requires high power levels to pass the high flow rates required. Excess power is available to inadvertently take the compressor beyond the overload limit to a hazardous condition on cold days if it is driven by a gas turbine.

=== The gas turbine compressor ===
The compressor has to run with the same speed (or fixed gear ratio) as its driving turbine and have equal power and pass the same flow as its driving turbine. This constitutes a gas generator which produces gas power. The compressor also has to pass the same flow as whatever uses the gas power, ie additional turbine stages for a single shaft engine or separate power turbines or a jet nozzle. This equal-flow requirement is alongside an equal pressure-ratio requirement, between overall compression and expansion ratios, and together they position the running line for steady state operation.

Single-shaft engines which drive an electric generator or helicopter rotor/aircraft propeller run with the compressor at no-load while accelerating to operating speed. No-load refers to a minimum fuelling as necessary to run the generator with no electrical load or rotor/propeller pitch at a minimum and occurs close to choke. Cohen et al. show electrical generators run up to required speed at no load. An increase in electrical load is obtained by increasing fuel flow. Barkey et al. give a detailed description of the sequence of events which bring the generator turbine to design speed, or grid frequency, with no load before increasing fuel as the load comes on. Grandcoing shows the Turbomeca Artouste helicopter engine constant speed operation from no-load idle to maximum power. No-load is minimum rotor pitch and idle fuel flow. The increase in fuel flow is shown on a compressor map as lines of constant engine temperature ratio, Turbine inlet temperature/Compressor inlet temperature. Grandcoing also shows the effect of a rapid load increase where the speed droops before regaining its required setting.

=== Jet engine with a fixed area nozzle ===
Aircraft engines with a fixed exhaust nozzle area have a single steady-state operating or running line which is fixed by fuel flow from idle to maximum speed. Variable vane angles and flow areas (bleed valves) in the compressor don't change the running line at a particular operating point because the angles and valve positions are unique for a corrected speed, that is they are controlled according to a schedule against corrected speed. Over or under-fuelling compared to the fuel flow required for constant-speed running moves the line up or down while the engine is changing speed to a new requirement.

=== Jet engine with adjustable area nozzle ===
Campbell shows the effect of different nozzle areas on the steady-state running line. Automatic control of the area was disabled for this investigation. In service the area is open at idle and progressively closes as the engine accelerates as shown by the area scheduling. An adjustable nozzle is not added for this particular purpose but if an afterburner is fitted then it can be used to reduce idle thrust and quicken acceleration times up to the thrust where the afterburner becomes operational. The ideal fan operating line on an augmented turbofan sets fan pressure ratio as high as possible to optimize fan performance and thrust while keeping adequate fan stall margin. The fan operating line is controlled by varying the nozzle area which acts like a throttling valve. The throttling is a combination of thermal from the burning fuel and geometric from the adjustable nozzle area.

=== Areas where unacceptable behaviour may occur ===
Low-speed rear-stage turbining occurs with excessive negative incidence leading to a pressure ratio less than one and the compressor stage absorbing power from the airflow. Two examples where crossing the surge line prevented accelerating to high speed occurred with the first designs of the Rolls-Royce Avon and the IAE V2500 and required major compressor redesigns. Rotating stall at low corrected speeds caused blade failures on early axial compressors.

=== Turbochargers for Diesel and gasoline engines ===
The compressor flow and pressure range is shown with a carpet plot of engine constant rpm and constant torque lines superimposed on the map. OpenCourseWare material shows a carpet plot of engine speed and load for the airflow requirements of 4-stroke truck engine. Shahed shows lines of constant engine speed and engine BMEP for a heavy-duty diesel engine. Woollenweber shows engine airflow requirements at different engine speeds and load/fuelling/torque. Hiereth et al. show operating lines for various applications such as a full-load operating line for a passenger car engine, the effect of an uncontrolled turbocharger on a truck diesel engine and wastegate control on passenger diesel and gasoline engines, and the effect of altitude on a compressor operating line.

=== Compressors in the oil and gas industry ===
Process requirements may change causing compressor conditions to vary. The compressor may be driven by a variable speed or constant speed machine. If driven by a constant speed electric motor it may be controlled with variable inlet guide vanes or suction and discharge throttling. Welch shows the effect of variable vane angle on the flow for a centrifugal compressor.

== Map for an aero-engine high pressure compressor ==
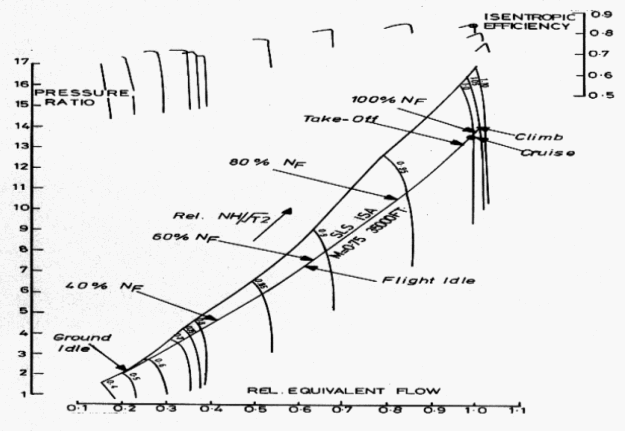
Typical high-pressure compressor map

=== Flow axis ===
The x-axis is usually some function of compressor entry mass flow, usually corrected flow or non-dimensional flow, as opposed to real flow. This axis can be considered a rough measure of the axial Mach number of the flow through the device.

=== Pressure ratio axis ===
Normally the y-axis is pressure ratio (P_{exit}/P_{inlet}), where P is stagnation (or total head) pressure.

ΔT/T (or similar), where T is stagnation (or total head) temperature, is also used.

=== Surge line ===
The slightly kinked diagonal line on the main part of the map is known as the surge (or stall) line. Above this line is a region of unstable flow, which is an area best avoided.

A compressor surge or compressor stall causes an abrupt reversal of airflow in the compressor. Compressor blades create a pumping action by working as airfoils. In a surge or stall, blades experience an aerodynamic stall (similar to an aircraft wing stalling) and become unable to hold back the higher pressure downstream, with a resulting violent flow reversal. The flame which is normally confined in the combustion chamber may come out of the engine inlet as well as the exhaust nozzle.

=== Surge margin ===
As the name suggests, surge margin provides a measure of how close an operating point is to surge. Unfortunately, there are a number of different definitions of surge margin. A popular one in use is defined as follows:

$SM = 100\% \cdot \frac{\dot{m_w} - \dot{m_s}}{\dot{m_w}}$

where:

$\dot{m_w}$ is the mass flow at the operating point, be it steady state or transient

$\dot{m_s}$ is the mass flow at surge, at same corrected speed as $\dot{m_w}$

=== Speed lines ===
The slightly curved, near vertical, lines on the main part of the map are the (constant rotational) corrected speed lines. They are a measure of rotor blade tip Mach number.

Note on the illustration that the speed lines are not distributed linearly with flow. This is because this particular compressor is fitted with variable stators, which open progressively as speed increases, causing an exaggerated increase in flow in the medium to high speed region. At low speed, the variable stators are locked, causing a more linear relationship between speed and flow.

Also note that beyond 100% flow, the speed lines close up rapidly, due to choking. Beyond choke, any further increase in speed will generate no further increase in airflow.

=== Efficiency axis ===
A sub-plot shows the variation of isentropic (i.e. adiabatic) efficiency with flow, at constant speed. Some maps use polytropic efficiency. Alternatively, for illustrative purposes, efficiency contours are sometimes cross-plotted onto the main map.

Note that the locus of peak efficiency exhibits a slight kink in its upward trend. This is due to the choking-up of the compressor as speed increases, with the variable stators closed-off. The trend line resumes once the variables start to move open.

=== Working line ===
Also shown on the map is a typical steady state working (or operating/running) line. This is a locus of the operating points of the engine, as it is throttled.

Being a high pressure ratio device, the working line is relatively shallow. If the unit had no variable geometry, there would be handling problems, because the surge line would be very steep and cross the working line at part-flow.

During a slam-acceleration from a mid-throttle setting, the compressor working line will move rapidly towards surge and then slowly approach the steady state operating point, further up the map. The reverse effect occurs during a slam-deceleration. These effects are caused by the sluggish response of the spool (i.e. inertia effects) to rapid changes in engine fuel flow. Compressor surge is a particular problem during slam-accelerations and can be overcome by suitable adjustments to the fueling schedule and/or use of blow-off (bleeding air off the compressor, for handling purposes).

In the particular example shown, a slam-acceleration from ground idle would cause a high-pressure compressor surge. Opening the blow-off would help, but some changes to the variable stator schedule might also be required.

Because a high-pressure compressor 'sees' the choked flow capacity of the high-pressure turbine, the compressor working line is hardly affected by flight conditions. The slope of the working line approximates to a constant corrected outlet flow.

== Map for a single-stage aero-engine fan ==
A low pressure ratio fan (such as that used on a high bypass ratio turbofan) has a range of working lines. At high flight speeds, the ram pressure ratio factors up the cold nozzle pressure ratio, causing the nozzle to choke. Above the choking condition, the working lines tend to coalesce into a unique steep straight line. When the nozzle unchokes, the working line starts to become more curved, reflecting the curvature of the nozzle characteristic. With falling flight Mach number, the cold nozzle pressure ratio decreases. Initially this has no effect upon the position of the working line, apart from the curved (unchoked) tail, which becomes longer. Eventually, the cold nozzle will become unchoked at lower flight Mach numbers, even at full throttle. The working lines will now become curved, gradually migrating towards surge as flight Mach number decreases. The lowest surge margin working line occurs at static conditions.

Owing to the nature of the constraints involved, the fan working lines of a mixed turbofan are somewhat steeper than those of the equivalent unmixed engine.

A fan may have two maps, one for the bypass (i.e. outer) section and one for the inner section which typically has longer, flatter, speed lines.

Military turbofans tend to have a much higher design fan pressure ratio than civil engines. Consequently, the final (mixed) nozzle is choked at all flight speeds, over most of the throttle range. However, at low throttle settings the nozzle will unchoke, causing the lower end of the working lines to have a short curved tail, particularly at low flight speeds.

However, ultra-high bypass ratio turbofans have a very low design fan pressure ratio (e.g. 1.2, on the bypass section). Consequently, even at cruise flight speeds, the cold (or mixed final) propelling nozzle may only be choked at high throttle settings. The fan working lines become more curved and migrate quickly towards surge as flight Mach number decreases. As a result, the static working line can be well into surge, particularly at low throttle settings.

One solution is to have a variable area cold (or mixed) nozzle. Increasing the nozzle area at low flight speeds brings the fan working line away from surge.

An alternative solution is to fit a variable pitch fan. Scheduling the pitch of the fan blades has no impact upon the position of the fan working lines, but can be used to move the surge line upwards, to improve fan surge margin.

== Map for an aero-engine IP compressor ==
Some turbofans have an intermediate pressure (IP) compressor located between the fan and the high pressure (HP) compressor to increase overall pressure ratio. US civil engines tend to mount the IP compressor on the LP shaft, directly behind the fan, whereas Rolls-Royce normally mount the IP compressor on a separate (i.e. IP) shaft, which is driven by an IP turbine. Either way, matching problems can arise.

The IP compressor outlet corrected flow must match the entry corrected flow of the HP compressor, which is decreasing as the engine is throttled back. At a certain IP compressor working line slope, the IP compressor outlet corrected flow remains constant. However, by adopting a shallower working line, the extra IP compressor pressure ratio at a given IP compressor entry corrected flow enables the IP compressor outlet corrected flow to decrease and match up with the falling HP compressor entry corrected flow. Unfortunately this can lead to a poor IP compressor surge margin at part flow.

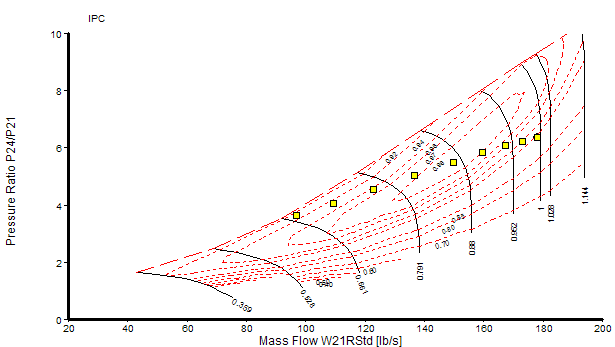
IPC working line, with blow-off valve closed throughout throttle range

Surge margin can be improved by adding variable stators to the IP compressor and/or adding a blow-off valve between the IP and HP compressors. The former makes the IP compressor surge line shallower, swinging it away from the shallow working line, thus improving IP compressor surge margin.

At a given IP compressor pressure ratio, opening the blow-off valve forces the IP compressor entry corrected flow to increase, to a point where the IP compressor surge margin tends to be better. Effectively, opening the blow-off valve lowers the IP compressor working line. Any flow surplus to that demanded by the HP compressor passes through the blow-off valve into the bypass duct. The blow-off valve is normally only opened at throttled conditions, since it wastes energy.

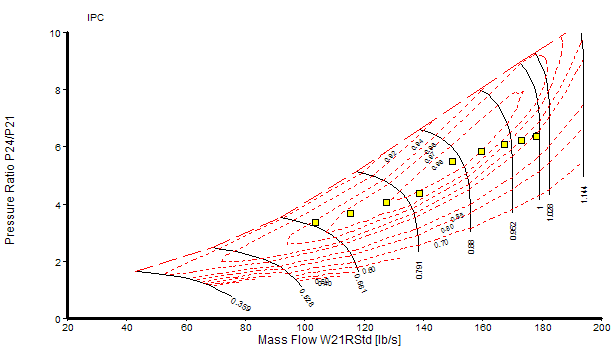
IPC working line, with blow-off valve open at medium entry flow conditions

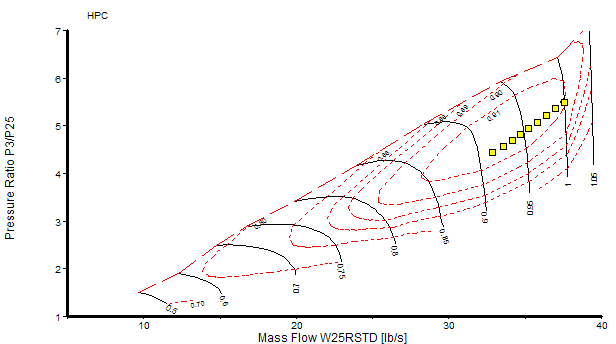
Corresponding HPC working line, with or without blow-off

== Sources ==
- Kurzke, Joachim; Halliwell, Ian (11 June 2018). Propulsion and power : an exploration of gas turbine performance modeling. Springer. ISBN 9783319759777.
