= Buckingham pi theorem =

Theorem in dimensional analysis

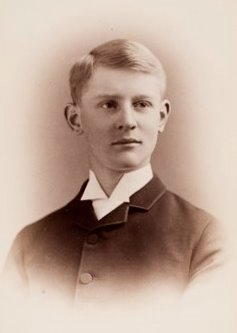
Edgar Buckingham circa 1886

In engineering, applied mathematics, and physics, the Buckingham π theorem is a key theorem in dimensional analysis. It is a formalisation of Rayleigh's method of dimensional analysis. Loosely, the theorem states that if there is a physically meaningful equation involving a certain number n of physical variables, then the original equation can be rewritten in terms of a set of p = n − k dimensionless parameters π_{1}, π_{2}, ..., π_{p} constructed from the original variables, where k is the number of physical dimensions involved; it is obtained as the rank of a particular matrix.

The theorem provides a method for computing sets of dimensionless parameters from the given variables, or nondimensionalization, even if the form of the equation is still unknown.

The Buckingham π theorem indicates that validity of the laws of physics does not depend on a specific unit system. A statement of this theorem is that any physical law can be expressed as an identity involving only dimensionless combinations (ratios or products) of the variables linked by the law (for example, pressure and volume are linked by Boyle's law – they are inversely proportional). If the dimensionless combinations' values changed with the systems of units, then the equation would not be an identity, and the theorem would not hold.

== History ==
Leonhard Euler was the first to write extensively about dimensional analysis for physical relations in 1765. Joseph Fourier also wrote about the principle of dimensional homogeneity in 1822, and Lord Rayleigh proposed, in 1877, a "method of dimensions" for analyzing physical systems. Edgar Buckingham, a physicist at the American National Bureau of Standards, formally outlined the π theorem for an arbitrary number of quantities. Buckingham's article introduced the use of the symbol "$\pi_i$" for the dimensionless variables (or parameters), and this is the source of the theorem's name. However, a French scientist, A. Vaschy, had previously outlined a similar theorem in 1878, as had Dimitri Riabouchinsky in 1911.

Although named for Edgar Buckingham, the π theorem was first proved by the French mathematician Joseph Bertrand in 1878. Bertrand considered only special cases of problems from electrodynamics and heat conduction, but his article contains, in distinct terms, all the basic ideas of the modern proof of the theorem and clearly indicates the theorem's utility for modelling physical phenomena. The technique of using the theorem ("the method of dimensions") became widely known due to the works of Rayleigh. The first application of the π theorem in the general case (Note: When in applying the π–theorem there arises an arbitrary function of dimensionless numbers.) to the dependence of pressure drop in a pipe upon governing parameters probably dates back to 1892, a heuristic proof with the use of series expansions, to 1894.

Formal generalization of the π theorem for the case of arbitrarily many quantities was given first by A. Vaschy in 1892, then in 1911—apparently independently—by both A. Federman and D. Riabouchinsky, and again in 1914 by Buckingham.

== Statement ==
More formally, the number $p$ of dimensionless terms that can be formed is equal to the nullity of the dimensional matrix, and $k$ is the rank. For experimental purposes, different systems that share the same description in terms of these dimensionless numbers are equivalent.

In mathematical terms, if we have a physically meaningful equation such as
$$f(q_1,q_2,\ldots,q_n)=0,$$
where $q_1, \ldots, q_n$ are any $n$ physical variables, and there is a maximal dimensionally independent subset of size $k$, (Note: A dimensionally independent set of variables is one for which the only exponents $q_1^{a_1} \, q_2^{a_2} \cdots q_k^{a_k}$ yielding a dimensionless quantity are $a_1 = a_2 = \cdots = 0$. This is precisely the notion of linear independence.) then the above equation can be restated as
$$F(\pi_1,\pi_2,\ldots,\pi_p)=0,$$
where $\pi_1, \ldots, \pi_p$ are dimensionless parameters constructed from the $q_i$ by $p = n - k$ dimensionless equations — the so-called Pi groups — of the form
$$\pi_i=q_1^{a_1}\,q_2^{a_2} \cdots q_n^{a_n},$$
where the exponents $a_i$ are rational numbers. (They can always be taken to be integers by redefining $\pi_i$ as being raised to a power that clears all denominators.) If there are $\ell$ fundamental units in play, then $p \geq n - \ell$.

== Significance ==
The Buckingham π theorem provides a method for computing sets of dimensionless parameters from given variables, even if the form of the equation remains unknown. However, the choice of dimensionless parameters is not unique; Buckingham's theorem only provides a way of generating sets of dimensionless parameters and does not indicate the most "physically meaningful".

Two systems for which these parameters coincide are called similar (as with similar triangles, they differ only in scale); they are equivalent for the purposes of the equation, and the experimentalist who wants to determine the form of the equation can choose the most convenient one. Most importantly, Buckingham's theorem describes the relation between the number of variables and fundamental dimensions.

== Similarity theory ==
The Buckingham pi theorem is fundamental to similarity theory, an empirical procedure for establishing relationships between variables in a physical system that reflect characteristics observed in related systems. For example, experiments measuring buoyancy flux in an atmosphere model may show a series of similar curves, but the physical origin of the similarity may not be known. The procedure of similarity theory guides the selection of a formula for reproducing the curves even absent the physical model.

Similarity theory is used fluid dynamics, with specific classes of similarity such as Monin-Obukhov similarity theory for surface layers or Rossby number similarity for analyzing atmospheric phenomena like tornadoes.

== Proof ==
For simplicity, it will be assumed that the space of fundamental and derived physical units forms a vector space over the real numbers, with the fundamental units as basis vectors, and with multiplication of physical units as the "vector addition" operation, and raising to powers as the "scalar multiplication" operation: represent a dimensional variable as the set of exponents needed for the fundamental units (with a power of zero if the particular fundamental unit is not present). For instance, the standard gravity $g$ has units of $\mathsf{L} / \mathsf{T}^2 = \mathsf{L}^1 \mathsf{T}^{-2}$ (length over time squared), so it is represented as the vector $(1, -2)$ with respect to the basis of fundamental units (length, time). We could also require that exponents of the fundamental units be rational numbers and modify the proof accordingly, in which case the exponents in the pi groups can always be taken as rational numbers or integers.

=== Rescaling units ===
Suppose we have quantities $q_1, q_2, \dots, q_n$, where the units of $q_i$ contain length raised to the power $c_i$. If we originally measure length in meters but later switch to centimeters, then the numerical value of $q_i$ would be rescaled by a factor of $100^{c_i}$. Any physically meaningful law should be invariant under an arbitrary rescaling of every fundamental unit; this is the fact that the pi theorem hinges on.

=== Formal proof ===
Given a system of $n$ dimensional variables $q_1, \ldots, q_n$ in $\ell$ fundamental (basis) dimensions, the dimensional matrix is the $\ell \times n$ matrix $M$ whose $\ell$ rows correspond to the fundamental dimensions and whose $n$ columns are the dimensions of the variables: the $(i, j)$th entry (where $1 \leq i \leq \ell$ and $1 \leq j \leq n$) is the power of the $i$th fundamental dimension in the $j$th variable. The matrix can be interpreted as taking in a combination of the variable quantities and giving out the dimensions of the combination in terms of the fundamental dimensions. So the $\ell \times 1$ (column) vector that results from the multiplication
$$M\begin{bmatrix}a_1\\ \vdots \\ a_n\end{bmatrix}$$
consists of the units of
$$q_1^{a_1}\,q_2^{a_2}\cdots q_n^{a_n}$$
in terms of the $\ell$ fundamental independent (basis) units. (Note: If these basis units are $b_1, \ldots, b_\ell$ and if the units of $q_j = m_{1j} b_1 + \cdots + m_{\ell j} b_\ell$ for every $1 \leq j \leq n$, then $$M = \begin{bmatrix} m_{11} & \cdots & m_{1j} & \cdots & m_{1n} \\ \vdots &        & \vdots &        & \vdots \\ m_{\ell 1} & \cdots & m_{\ell j} & \cdots & m_{\ell n} \\ \end{bmatrix}$$ so that, for instance, the units of $q_1$ in terms of these basis units are $$M \left(\left[1 \ 0 \ \cdots \ 0\right]^{\operatorname{T}}\right) = \begin{bmatrix} m_{11} \\ \vdots \\ m_{\ell 1} \\ \end{bmatrix}.$$ For a concrete example, suppose that the $\ell = 2$ fundamental units are meters $b_1 = m$ and seconds $b_2 = s,$ and that there are $n = 3$ dimensional variables: $q_1 = m/s^2, q_2 = 1/m, q_3 = s / m.$ By definition of vector addition and scalar multiplication of units, $$q_1 = ms^{-2} = 1 m + (-2) s,\quad q_2 = m^{-1} = (-1) m + 0 s,\quad\text{and}\quad q_3 = m^{-1} s = (-1) m + 1 s,$$ so that $$M = \begin{bmatrix} m_{11} & m_{12} & m_{13} \\ m_{21} & m_{22} & m_{23} \\ \end{bmatrix} = \begin{bmatrix} 1  & -1 & -1 \\ -2 & 0  & 1 \\ \end{bmatrix}.$$ By definition, the dimensionless variables are those whose units are $m^0 s^0,$ which are exactly the vectors in $$\ker M = \operatorname{span} \left\{ [1, -1, 2]^{\operatorname{T}} \right\} = \left\{ \left(q_1 - q_2 + 2 q_3\right)^s : s \in \Q \right\}.$$ This can be verified by a direct computation: $$q_1 - q_2 + 2 q_3 = \left(m s^{-2}\right)^1 + \left(m^{-1}\right)^{-1} + \left(s m^{-1}\right)^2 = m^1 s^{-2} + m^1 + m^{-2} s^2 = m^{1+1+(-2)} s^{-2 + 0 + 2} = m^0 s^0,$$ which is indeed dimensionless. Consequently, if some physical law states that $q_1, q_2, q_3$ are necessarily related by a (presumably unknown) equation of the form $f\left(q_1, q_2, q_3\right) = 0$ for some (unknown) function $f$ with $\operatorname{domain}(f) \subseteq \R^3$ (that is, the tuple $\left(q_1, q_2, q_3\right)$ is necessarily a zero of $f$), then there exists some (also unknown) function $F : \R^1 \to \R$ that depends on only $p = 3 - 2 = 1$ variable, the dimensionless variable $\pi_1 := q_1 - q_2 + 2 q_3 = q_1 q_3^2 / q_2$ (or any non-zero rational power $\hat{\pi}_1 := \pi_1^s$ of $\pi_1,$ where $0 \neq s \in \Q$), such that $F\left(\pi_1\right) = 0$ holds (if $\hat{\pi}_1 := \pi_1^s$ is used instead of $\pi_1$ then $F$ can be replaced with $\hat{F}(x) := F\left(x^{1/s}\right)$ and once again $\hat{F}\left(\hat{\pi}_1\right) = 0$ holds). Thus in terms of the original variables, $F\left(q_1 q_3^2 / q_2\right) = 0$ must hold (alternatively, if using $\hat{\pi}_1 := \pi_1^{1/2} = \sqrt{\pi_1}$ for instance, then $\hat{F}\left(\sqrt{q_1 q_3^2 / q_2}\right) = 0$ must hold). In other words, the Buckingham π theorem implies that $q_1 q_3^2 / q_2 \in F^{-1}(0),$ so that if it happens to be the case that this $F$ has exactly one zero, call it $C,$ then the equation $q_1 q_3^2 / q_2 = C$ will necessarily hold (the theorem does not give information about what the exact value of the constant $C$ will be, nor does it guarantee that $F$ has exactly one zero).)

If we rescale the $i$th fundamental unit by a factor of $\alpha_i$, then $q_j$ gets rescaled by $\alpha_1^{-m_{1j}}\, \alpha_2^{-m_{2j}} \cdots \alpha_\ell^{-m_{\ell j}}$, where $m_{ij}$ is the $(i, j)$th entry of the dimensional matrix. In order to convert this into a linear algebra problem, we take logarithms (the base is irrelevant), yielding
$$\begin{bmatrix} \log{q_1} \\ \vdots \\ \log{q_n} \end{bmatrix} \mapsto \begin{bmatrix} \log{q_1} \\ \vdots \\ \log{q_n} \end{bmatrix} - M^\operatorname{T} \begin{bmatrix} \log{\alpha_1} \\ \vdots \\ \log{\alpha_\ell} \end{bmatrix},$$
which is an action of $\mathbb{R}^\ell$ on $\mathbb{R}^n$. We define a physical law to be an arbitrary function $f \colon (\mathbb{R}^+)^n \to \mathbb{R}$ such that $(q_1, q_2, \dots, q_n)$ is a permissible set of values for the physical system when $f(q_1, q_2, \dots, q_n) = 0$. We further require $f$ to be invariant under this action. Hence it descends to a function $F \colon \mathbb{R}^n / \operatorname{im}{M^\operatorname{T}} \to \mathbb{R}$. All that remains is to exhibit an isomorphism between $\mathbb{R}^n/\operatorname{im}{M^\operatorname{T}}$ and $\mathbb{R}^p$, the (log) space of pi groups $(\log{\pi_1}, \log{\pi_2}, \dots, \log{\pi_p})$.

We construct an $n \times p$ matrix $K$ whose columns are a basis for $\ker{M}$. It tells us how to embed $\mathbb{R}^p$ into $\mathbb{R}^n$ as the kernel of $M$. That is, we have an exact sequence

$$0 \to \mathbb{R}^p \xrightarrow{\ K \ } \mathbb{R}^n \xrightarrow{\ M\ } \mathbb{R}^\ell.$$

Taking tranposes yields another exact sequence

$$\mathbb{R}^\ell \xrightarrow{\ M^\operatorname{T}\ } \mathbb{R}^n \xrightarrow{\ K^\operatorname{T}\ } \mathbb{R}^p \to 0.$$

The first isomorphism theorem produces the desired isomorphism, which sends the coset $v + M^\operatorname{T} \mathbb{R}^\ell$ to $K^\operatorname{T} v$. This corresponds to rewriting the tuple $(\log q_1, \log q_2, \dots, \log q_n)$ into the pi groups $(\log\pi_1, \log\pi_2, \dots, \log\pi_p)$ coming from the columns of $K$.

The International System of Units defines seven base units, which are the ampere, kelvin, second, metre, kilogram, candela and mole. It is sometimes advantageous to introduce additional base units and techniques to refine the technique of dimensional analysis. (See orientational analysis and reference.)

== Examples ==
=== Speed ===
This example is elementary but serves to demonstrate the procedure.

Suppose a car is driving at 100 km/h; how long does it take to go 200 km?

This question considers $n = 3$ dimensioned variables: distance $d$, time $t$, and speed $v$, and we are seeking some law of the form $t = \operatorname{Duration}(v, d).$ Any two of these variables are dimensionally independent, but the three taken together are not. Thus there is $p = n - k = 3 - 2 = 1$ dimensionless quantity.

The dimensional matrix is
$$M = \begin{bmatrix}
1 & 0 & \;\;\;1\\
0 & 1 & -1
\end{bmatrix}$$
in which the rows correspond to the basis dimensions $\mathsf{L}$ and $\mathsf{T}$, and the columns to the considered dimensions $\mathsf{L}$, $\mathsf{T}$, and $\mathsf{V}$, where the latter stands for the speed dimension. The elements of the matrix correspond to the powers to which the respective dimensions are to be raised. For instance, the third column $(1, -1)$, states that $\mathsf{V} = \mathsf{L}^0 \mathsf{T}^0 \mathsf{V}^1,$ represented by the column vector $\mathbf{v}=[0,0,1],$ is expressible in terms of the basis dimensions as $\mathsf{V} = \mathsf{L}^1 \mathsf{T}^{-1} = \mathsf{L} / \mathsf{T},$ since $M\mathbf{v} = [1,-1].$

For a dimensionless constant $\pi = \mathsf{L}^{a_1} \mathsf{T}^{a_2} \mathsf{V}^{a_3},$ we are looking for vectors $\mathbf{a}=[a_1,a_2,a_3]$ such that the matrix-vector product $M \mathbf{a}$ equals the zero vector $[0, 0].$ In linear algebra, the set of vectors with this property is known as the kernel (or nullspace) of the dimensional matrix. In this particular case its kernel is one-dimensional. The dimensional matrix as written above is in reduced row echelon form, so one can read off a non-zero kernel vector to within a multiplicative constant:
$$\mathbf{a} = \begin{bmatrix} -1\\ \;\;\;1\\ \;\;\;1\\ \end{bmatrix}.$$

If the dimensional matrix were not already reduced, one could perform Gauss–Jordan elimination on the dimensional matrix to more easily determine the kernel. It follows that the dimensionless constant, replacing the dimensions by the corresponding dimensioned variables, may be written:
$$\pi = d^{-1}t^1v^1 = tv/d.$$

Since the kernel is only defined to within a multiplicative constant, the above dimensionless constant raised to any arbitrary power yields another (equivalent) dimensionless constant.

Dimensional analysis has thus provided a general equation relating the three physical variables:
$$F(\pi) = 0,$$
or, letting $C$ denote a zero of function $F$,
$$\pi = C,$$
which can be written in the desired form (which recall was $t = \operatorname{Duration}(v, d)$) as
$$t = C\frac{d}{v}.$$

The actual relationship between the three variables is simply $d = vt.$ In other words, in this case $F$ has one physically relevant root, and it is unity. The fact that only a single value of $C$ will do and that it is equal to 1 is not revealed by the technique of dimensional analysis.

=== The simple pendulum ===
We wish to determine the period $\tau$ of small oscillations in a simple pendulum. It will be assumed that it is a function of the length $\ell$, the mass $m$, and the acceleration due to gravity on the surface of the Earth $g,$ which has dimensions of length divided by time squared. The model is of the form
$$f(\tau,m,\ell,g) = 0.$$

(Note that it is written as a relation, not as a function: $\tau$ is not written here as a function of $m$, $\ell$, and $g$.)

Period, mass, and length are dimensionally independent, but acceleration can be expressed in terms of time and length, which means the four variables taken together are not dimensionally independent. Thus we need only $p = n - k = 4 - 3 = 1$ dimensionless parameter, denoted by $\pi,$ and the model can be re-expressed as
$$F(\pi) = 0,$$
where $\pi$ is given by
$$\pi = \tau^{a_1} m^{a_2} \ell^{a_3} g^{a_4}$$
for some values of $a_1, a_2, a_3, a_4.$

The dimensions of the dimensional quantities are:
$$\begin{align}
\tau &= \mathsf{T}, & m &= \mathsf{M}, \\
\ell &= \mathsf{L}, & g &= \mathsf{L}/\mathsf{T}^2.
\end{align}$$

The dimensional matrix is:
$$\mathbf{M} = \begin{bmatrix}
1 & 0 & 0 & -2\\
0 & 1 & 0 &  0\\
0 & 0 & 1 &  1
\end{bmatrix}.$$

(The rows correspond to the dimensions $\mathsf{T}$, $\mathsf{M}$ and $\mathsf{L}$, and the columns to the dimensional variables $\tau$, $m$, $\ell$, and $g$. For instance, the 4th column, $(-2, 0, 1),$ states that the $g$ variable has dimensions of $\mathsf{T}^{-2} \mathsf{M}^0 \mathsf{L}^1.$)

We are looking for a kernel vector $a = \left[a_1, a_2, a_3, a_4\right]$ such that the matrix product of $\mathbf{M}$ on $a$ yields the zero vector $[0,0,0].$ The dimensional matrix as written above is in reduced row echelon form, so one can read off a kernel vector within a multiplicative constant:
$$a = \begin{bmatrix}2\\ 0 \\ -1 \\ 1\end{bmatrix}.$$

Were it not already reduced, one could perform Gauss–Jordan elimination on the dimensional matrix to more easily determine the kernel. It follows that the dimensionless constant may be written:
$$\begin{align}
\pi &= \tau^2 m^0 \ell^{-1} g^1 \\
&= g \tau^2/\ell
\end{align}.$$
In fundamental terms:
$$\pi = (\mathsf{T})^2 (\mathsf{M})^0 (\mathsf{L})^{-1} \left(\mathsf{L}/\mathsf{T}^2\right)^1 = 1,$$
which is dimensionless. Since the kernel is only defined to within a multiplicative constant, if the above dimensionless constant is raised to any arbitrary power, it will yield another equivalent dimensionless constant.

In this example, three of the four dimensional quantities are fundamental units, so the last (which is $g$) must be a combination of the previous. Note that if $a_2$ (the coefficient of $m$) had been non-zero then there would be no way to cancel the $m$ value; therefore $a_2$ must be zero. Dimensional analysis has allowed us to conclude that the period of the pendulum is not a function of its mass $m$. (In the 3D space of powers of mass, time, and distance, we can say that the vector for mass is linearly independent from the vectors for the three other variables. Up to a scaling factor, $\vec g + 2 \vec \tau - \vec \ell$ is the only nontrivial way to construct a vector of a dimensionless parameter.)

The model can now be expressed as:
$$F{\left(g \tau^2/ \ell\right)} = 0.$$

Then this implies that $g \tau^2/\ell = C_i$ for some zero $C_i$ of the function $F$. If there is only one zero, call it $C$, then $g \tau^2/\ell = C.$ It requires more physical insight or an experiment to show that there is indeed only one zero and that the constant is in fact given by $C = 4\pi^2.$

For large oscillations of a pendulum, the analysis is complicated by an additional dimensionless parameter, the maximum swing angle. The above analysis is a good approximation as the angle approaches zero.

=== Electric power ===
To demonstrate the application of the π theorem, consider the power consumption of a stirrer with a given shape. The power, P, in dimensions [M · L^{2}/T^{3}], is a function of the density, ρ [M/L^{3}], and the viscosity of the fluid to be stirred, μ [M/(L · T)], as well as the size of the stirrer given by its diameter, D [L], and the angular speed of the stirrer, ω [1/T]. Therefore, we have a total of n = 5 variables representing our example. Those n = 5 variables are built up from k = 3 independent dimensions, e.g., length: L (SI units: m), time: T (s), and mass: M (kg).

According to the π-theorem, the n = 5 variables can be reduced by the k = 3 dimensions to form p = n − k = 5 − 3 = 2 independent dimensionless numbers. Usually, these quantities are chosen as $\mathrm{Re} = {\frac{\rho \omega D^2}{\mu}}$, commonly named the Reynolds number which describes the fluid flow regime, and $N_\mathrm{p} = \frac{P}{\rho \omega^3 D^5}$, the power number, which is the dimensionless description of the stirrer.

Note that the two dimensionless quantities are not unique and depend on which of the n = 5 variables are chosen as the k = 3 dimensionally independent basis variables, which, in this example, appear in both dimensionless quantities. The Reynolds number and power number fall from the above analysis if $\rho$, n, and D are chosen to be the basis variables. If, instead, $\mu$, n, and D are selected, the Reynolds number is recovered while the second dimensionless quantity becomes $N_\mathrm{Rep} = \frac{P}{\mu D^3 \omega^2}$. We note that $N_\mathrm{Rep}$ is the product of the Reynolds number and the power number.

=== Other examples ===
An example of dimensional analysis can be found for the case of the mechanics of a thin, solid and parallel-sided rotating disc. There are five variables involved which reduce to two non-dimensional groups. The relationship between these can be determined by numerical experiment using, for example, the finite element method.

The theorem has also been used in fields other than physics, for instance in sports science.

== See also ==
- Blast wave
- Dimensionless quantity
- Natural units
- Similitude (model)
- Reynolds number
