= Womersley number =

Dimensionless expression of the pulsatile flow frequency in relation to viscous effects

The Womersley number ($\alpha$ or $\text{Wo}$) is a dimensionless number in biofluid mechanics and biofluid dynamics. It is a dimensionless expression of the pulsatile flow frequency in relation to viscous effects. It is named after John R. Womersley (1907–1958) for his work with blood flow in arteries. The Womersley number is important in keeping dynamic similarity when scaling an experiment. An example of this is scaling up the vascular system for experimental study. The Womersley number is also important in determining the thickness of the boundary layer to see if entrance effects can be ignored.

The square of this number is also referred to as the Stokes number, $\text{Stk}={\text{Wo}}^2$, due to the pioneering work done by Sir George Stokes on the Stokes second problem.

== Derivation ==
The Womersley number, usually denoted $\alpha$, is defined by the relation
$$\alpha^2 = \frac{\text{transient inertial force}}{\text{viscous force}} = \frac{ \rho \omega U}{\mu U L^{-2} } = \frac{ \omega L^{2} }{\mu \rho^{-1} } =  \frac{ \omega L^{2} }{\nu} \, ,$$
where $L$ is an appropriate length scale (for example the radius of a pipe), $\omega$ is the angular frequency of the oscillations, and $\nu$, $\rho$, $\mu$ are the kinematic viscosity, density, and dynamic viscosity of the fluid, respectively. The Womersley number is normally written in the powerless form
$$\alpha = L \left( \frac{\omega \rho}{\mu} \right)^\frac{1}{2} \, .$$

In the cardiovascular system, the pulsation frequency, density, and dynamic viscosity are constant, however the Characteristic length, which in the case of blood flow is the vessel diameter, changes by three orders of magnitudes (OoM) between the aorta and fine capillaries. The Womersley number thus changes due to the variations in vessel size across the vasculature system. The Womersley number of human blood flow can be estimated as follows: $\alpha = L \left( \frac{\omega \rho}{\mu} \right)^\frac{1}{2} \, .$

Below is a list of estimated Womersley numbers in different human blood vessels:

Vessel	Diameter (m)	$\alpha$
Aorta	0.025	13.83
Artery	0.004	2.21
Arteriole	3×10^{−5}	0.0166
Capillary	8×10^{−6}	4.43×10^{−3}
Venule	2×10^{−5}	0.011
Veins	0.005	2.77
Vena cava	0.03	16.6

It can also be written in terms of the dimensionless Reynolds number (Re) and Strouhal number (St):
$$\alpha = \left( 2\pi\, \mathrm{Re} \, \mathrm{St} \right)^{1/2}\, .$$

The Womersley number arises in the solution of the linearized Navier–Stokes equations for oscillatory flow (presumed to be laminar and incompressible) in a tube. It expresses the ratio of the transient or oscillatory inertia force to the shear force. When $\alpha$ is small (1 or less), it means the frequency of pulsations is sufficiently low that a parabolic velocity profile has time to develop during each cycle, and the flow will be very nearly in phase with the pressure gradient, and will be given to a good approximation by Poiseuille's law, using the instantaneous pressure gradient. When $\alpha$ is large (10 or more), it means the frequency of pulsations is sufficiently large that the velocity profile is relatively flat or plug-like, and the mean flow lags the pressure gradient by about 90 degrees. Along with the Reynolds number, the Womersley number governs dynamic similarity.

The boundary layer thickness $\delta$ that is associated with the transient acceleration is inversely related to the Womersley number. This can be seen by recognizing the Stokes number as the square root of the Womersley number.
$$\delta = \frac{L}{\alpha}= \frac{L}{\sqrt{\mathrm{S_k}}},$$
where $L$ is a characteristic length.

== Biofluid mechanics ==
In a flow distribution network that progresses from a large tube to many small tubes (e.g. a blood vessel network), the frequency, density, and dynamic viscosity are (usually) the same throughout the network, but the tube radii change. Therefore, the Womersley number is large in large vessels and small in small vessels. As the vessel diameter decreases with each division the Womersley number soon becomes quite small. The Womersley numbers tend to 1 at the level of the terminal arteries. In the arterioles, capillaries, and venules the Womersley numbers are less than one. In these regions the inertia force becomes less important and the flow is determined by the balance of viscous stresses and the pressure gradient. This is called microcirculation.

Some typical values for the Womersley number in the cardiovascular system for a canine at a heart rate of 2 Hz are:

- Ascending aorta – 13.2
- Descending aorta – 11.5
- Abdominal aorta – 8
- Femoral artery – 3.5
- Carotid artery – 4.4
- Arterioles – 0.04
- Capillaries – 0.005
- Venules – 0.035
- Inferior vena cava – 8.8
- Main pulmonary artery – 15

It has been argued that universal biological scaling laws (power-law relationships that describe variation of quantities such as metabolic rate, lifespan, length, etc., with body mass) are a consequence of the need for energy minimization, the fractal nature of vascular networks, and the crossover from high to low Womersley number flow as one progresses from large to small vessels.
