= John R. Womersley =

British mathematician, computer scientist and biophysicist

John Ronald Womersley
- Born: 20 June 1907; Morley, West Riding of Yorkshire
- Died: 7 March 1958 (aged 50); Columbus Ohio
- Education: Imperial College of Science and Technology
- Known for: Womersley flow Womersley number
- Scientific career
- Fields: Mathematics, Computer Science, Fluid Dynamics
- Workplaces: Shirley Institute, National Physical Laboratory, Wright Air Development Center

John Ronald Womersley (20 June 1907 – 7 March 1958) was a British mathematician and computer scientist who made important contributions to computer development, and hemodynamics. Nowadays he is principally remembered for his contribution to blood flow, fluid dynamics and the eponymous Womersley number, a dimensionless parameter characterising unsteady flow.

== Biography ==
=== Early life and education ===
Womersley was born on 20 June 1907 in Morley, near Leeds in the West Riding of Yorkshire. He was the only child of George William and Ruth Womersley; his father managed a grocery store in Morley. He was educated at Morley Grammar School from 1917 to 1925. In 1925 he was awarded an Open Scholarship to the University of Cambridge and the Royal Scholarship in Physics at Imperial College of Science and Technology, but he chose to read mathematics at Imperial College. His courses included Pure and Applied Mathematics, Physics, Hydrodynamics and the Kinetic Theory of Gases. He was awarded a BSc degree with first-class honours in mathematics in 1929 and became an associate of the Royal College of Science. He remained at Imperial College for another two years and was awarded the Diploma of Imperial College (D.I.C.) in 1930.

=== Work ===
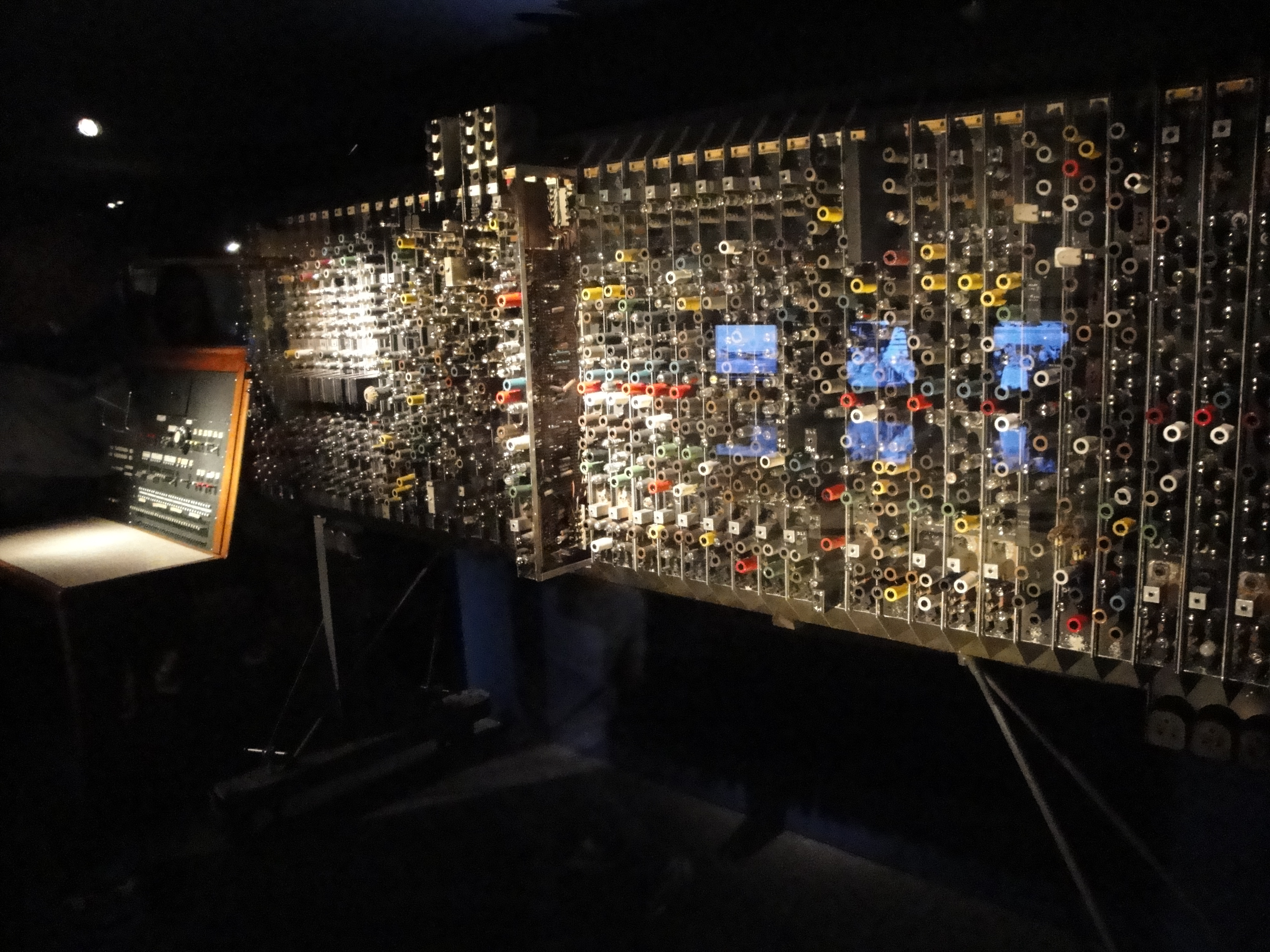
Pilot ACE (Automatic Computing Engine)

In 1930 Womersley left Imperial College to take up a position as a junior research officer at the Shirley Institute (British Cotton Industry Research Institute), Manchester. There he applied mathematical techniques to problems in textile manufacture, including research on cotton spinning, drafting fibrous materials, and, through L. H. C. Tippett, the use of mathematical statistics in industrial production and quality control. While at the Shirley Institute he also met Leslie Comrie and became interested in computational techniques. As a result, he spent a month at HM Nautical Almanac Office, London learning Comrie's numerical approaches. In 1936 he collaborated with Douglas Hartree who had built a Differential Analyser at the University of Manchester; together they devised a much cited method for the numerical integration of partial differential equations. In 1937, with war looming, he joined the armaments research department at Woolwich as a scientific officer, and worked on using statistical techniques applied to ballistics and ammunition proofing. In 1942, after the outbreak of World War II, he was appointed assistant director of scientific research at the Ministry of Supply and asked to set up and head the Advisory Service on Statistical Methods (later known as SR17). This organization was responsible for advice and research into ammunition supply, engineering factories and the investigations of a range of Government Inspectorates. It was particularly important in ensuring quality control and promoting sample inspection methods to British industry during wartime. In 1944 he joined the British Association mathematical tables committee and in the same year he was appointed as the first superintendent of the Mathematics Division of the National Physical Laboratory (NPL). In addition to being responsible for statistical quality control, NPL was tasked with building an electronic computer, for which Womersley coined the name Automatic Computing Engine (ACE), echoing Babbage's Analytical Engine. Womersley was therefore responsible for the set up and operation of the first national computing centre in UK. One of his first actions was to visit the US for a fact-finding tour, where he learned about ENIAC (Electronic Numerical Integrator and Computer), Howard Aitken's Harvard machine, George Stibitz's machines and von Neumann's plans for the binary computer, EDVAC (Electronic Discrete Variable Automatic Computer). On his return, he recruited Alan Turing to work on the ACE section and backed him strongly. Womersley also recruited Donald Davies in 1947. However, progress on the ACE project was delayed and Turing developed a dislike of Womersley and disdain for his abilities and left the project in 1948. Davies then took over from Turing and a small experimental model, pilot ACE was produced in 1950. Whether Womersley led NPL successfully has been questioned, although the consensus seems to be that he did a good job in difficult circumstances. He himself left the project in 1950, before the prototype pilot ACE was completed, to join the British Tabulating Machine Company (BTM), a forerunner of International Computers Limited (ICL). There he recognised that the computers previously developed by academia or governments were too large and expensive to be commercially viable and he recruited Andrew Booth who had developed the All Purpose Electronic Computer at Birbeck University, as a consultant to develop a smaller inexpensive computer. The computer copied from Booth's original design by Ray Bird was named the Hollerith Electronic Computer (HEC1), and was Britain's first mass-produced business computer.

Simulation showing the predicted flow velocity profile in tubes with different Womersley numbers

In 1954 Womersley left BTM and joined a research team, led by Donald McDonald at St Bartholomew's Hospital, who were studying blood flow in arteries. This change seems to have been a temporary arrangement to 'fill in time whilst awaiting completion of arrangements to come to WADC' (the Wright Air Development Center, Dayton, Ohio, USA). His collaboration with McDonald may have been prompted by his eldest daughter, Barbara, who was studying medicine at St Bartholomew's. Whatever the reason, this move led to a new and highly productive period in his research, as he applied mathematical and computational techniques to the analysis of blood flow and hemodynamics. Most notably in 1955 he published an article which described a dimensionless parameter (α) which characterised the nature of unsteady flow; subsequently this has been called the Womersley number. In July 1955, as planned, he moved to WADC to take a post as acting chief of the Analysis Section, System Dynamics Branch Aeronautical Research Laboratory. In 1956, he was promoted to Supervisory Mathematician and then Supervisory Aeronautical Research Engineer (Flight Systems), although he continued to publish on mathematical aspects of blood flow until his early death in 1958. His 1957 monograph on 'An elastic tube theory of pulse transmission and oscillatory flow in mammalian arteries' is widely regarded as a major influence in the field. In 1957 he returned to Britain for treatment of cancer. He underwent a number of operations in London and returned to Ohio in 1957, but never fully recovered and died at Ohio State University Hospital, Columbus, on 7 March 1958.

=== Personal life ===
Womersley married Jean Isobel Jordan in Hammersmith, London in 1931. The couple had three daughters, Barbara, Ruth and Marion. Womersley's wife, Jean lived in Dayton until 1996, and as of 2014, they were survived by two daughters and six grandchildren living in the US and Canada.

== Selected publications ==
- Womersley, J. R. (1937). "The application of differential geometry to the study of the deformation of cloth under stress". Shirley Institute Memoirs. 16 (1).
- Hartree, D. R.; Womersley, J. R. (1937). "A method for the numerical or mechanical solution of certain types of partial differential equations". Proc. R. Soc. Lond. A. 161 (906): 353–366. Bibcode:1937RSPSA.161..353H. doi:10.1098/rspa.1937.0149.
- Womersley, J. R. (1946). "Scientific computing in Great Britain". Mathematical Tables and Other Aids to Computation. 2 (15): 110–117. doi:10.2307/2002621. JSTOR 2002621.
- Womersley, J. R. (1955). "Oscillatory motion of a viscous liquid in a thin-walled elastic tube. I. The linear approximation for long waves". Philos. Mag. 46 (373): 199–221. doi:10.1080/14786440208520564.
- Womersley, J. R. (1955). "Method for the calculation of velocity, rate of flow and viscous drag in arteries when the pressure gradient is known". J. Physiol. 127 (3): 553–563. doi:10.1113/jphysiol.1955.sp005276. PMC 1365740. PMID 14368548.
- Womersley, J. R. (1957). An Elastic Tube Theory of Pulse Transmission and Oscillatory Flow in Mammalian Arteries, Wright Air Development Center Technical Report 56-614, (sometimes referred to as WADC TR56-614 and sometimes cited as 1958)
- A complete bibliography was compiled by Brian E. Carpenter and Robert W. Doran
