= Stokes number =

Dimensionless number characterising the behavior of particles suspended in a fluid flow

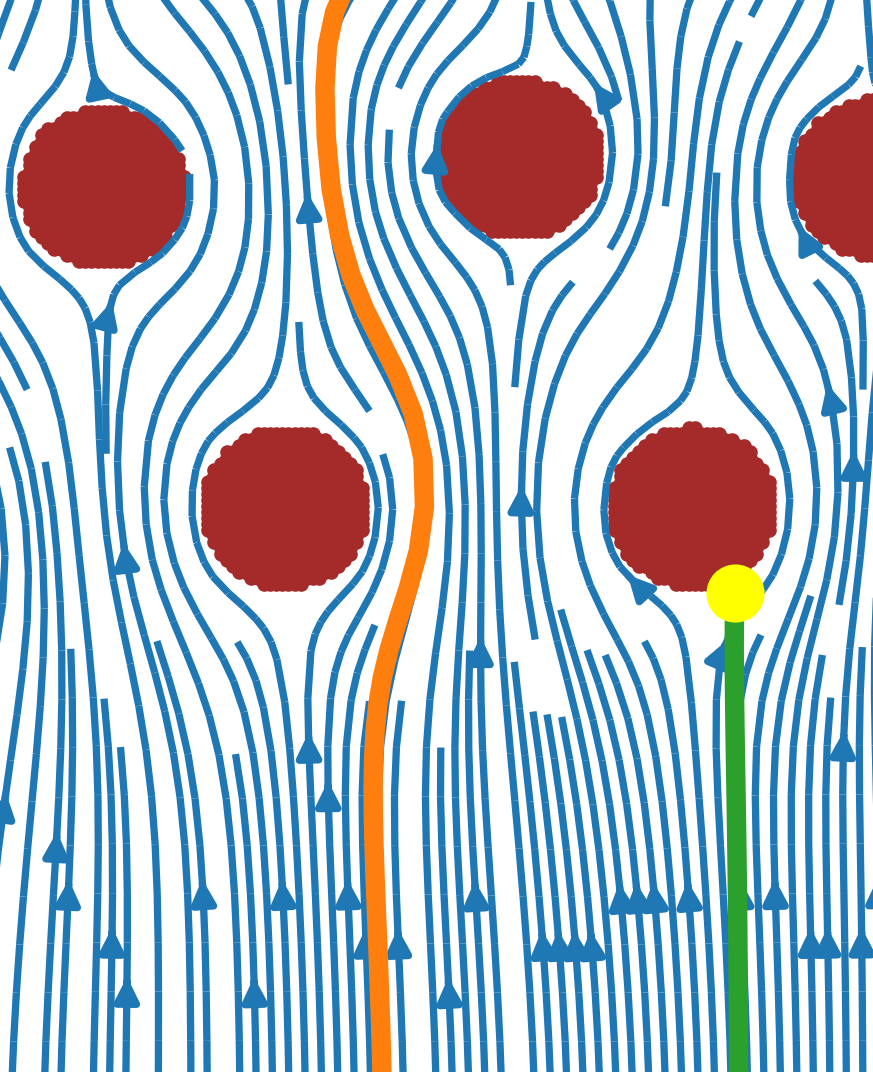
Illustration of the effect of varying the Stokes number. Orange and green trajectories are for small and large Stokes numbers, respectively. Orange curve is trajectory of particle with Stokes number less than one that follows the streamlines (blue), while green curve is for a Stokes number greater than one, and so the particle does not follow the streamlines. That particle collides with one of the obstacles (brown circles) at point shown in yellow.

The Stokes number (Stk), named after George Gabriel Stokes, is a dimensionless number characterising the behavior of particles suspended in a fluid flow. The Stokes number is defined as the ratio of the characteristic time of a particle (or droplet) to a characteristic time of the flow or of an obstacle, or

$$\mathrm{Stk} = \frac{t_0 \,u_0}{l_0}$$
where $t_0$ is the relaxation time of the particle (the time constant in the exponential decay of the particle velocity due to drag), $u_0$ is the fluid velocity of the flow well away from the obstacle, and $l_0$ is the characteristic dimension of the obstacle (typically its diameter) or a characteristic length scale in the flow (like boundary layer thickness). A particle with a low Stokes number follows fluid streamlines (perfect advection), while a particle with a large Stokes number is dominated by its inertia and continues along its initial trajectory.

In the case of Stokes flow, which is when the particle (or droplet) Reynolds number is less than about one, the particle drag coefficient is inversely proportional to the Reynolds number itself. In that case, the characteristic time of the particle can be written as
$$t_0 = \frac{\rho_p d_p^2}{18 \mu_g}$$
where $\rho_p$ is the particle density, $d_p$ is the particle diameter and $\mu_g$ is the fluid dynamic viscosity.

In experimental fluid dynamics, the Stokes number is a measure of flow tracer fidelity in particle image velocimetry (PIV) experiments where very small particles are entrained in turbulent flows and optically observed to determine the speed and direction of fluid movement (also known as the velocity field of the fluid). For acceptable tracing accuracy, the particle response time should be faster than the smallest time scale of the flow. Smaller Stokes numbers represent better tracing accuracy; for $\mathrm{Stk} \gg 1$, particles will detach from a flow especially where the flow decelerates abruptly. For $\mathrm{Stk} \ll1$, particles follow fluid streamlines closely. If $\mathrm{Stk} < 0.1$, tracing accuracy errors are below 1%.

== Relaxation time and tracking error in particle image velocimetry (PIV) ==
Comparison between two different particle sizes for tracking accuracy for PIV. Simulated particles (blue dots) of propylene glycol advecting in a stagnation point flow field (gray streamlines). Note that the 1 mm particles crash onto the stagnation plate whereas the 0.1 mm particles follow the streamlines.

The Stokes number provides a means of estimating the quality of PIV data sets, as previously discussed. However, a definition of a characteristic velocity or length scale may not be evident in all applications. Thus, a deeper insight of how a tracking delay arises could be drawn by simply defining the differential equations of a particle in the Stokes regime. A particle moving with the fluid at some velocity $v_p(t)$ will encounter a variable fluid velocity field as it advects. Let's assume the velocity of the fluid, in the Lagrangian frame of reference of the particle, is $v_f(t)$. It is the difference between these velocities that will generate the drag force necessary to correct the particle path:

$$\Delta v(t)=v_f(t)-v_p(t)$$

The stokes drag force is then:

$$F_D = 3\pi \mu d_p \Delta v$$

The particle mass is:

$$m_p = \rho_p \frac{4}{3} \pi \bigg(\frac{d_p}{2}\bigg)^3 = \rho_p \frac{\pi d_p^3}{6}$$

Thus, the particle acceleration can be found through Newton's second law:

$$\frac{d v_p(t)}{dt} = \frac{F_D}{m_p} = \frac{18 \mu}{{d_p}^2 \rho_p} \Delta v(t)$$

Note the relaxation time $t_0=\frac{\rho_p d_p^2}{18 \mu_g}$ can be replaced to yield:

$$\frac{d v_p(t)}{dt} = \frac{1}{t_0} \Delta v(t)$$

The first-order differential equation above can be solved through the Laplace transform method:

$$t_0 s v_p(s) = v_f - v_p(s)$$
$$\frac{v_p(s)}{v_f(s)} = \frac{1}{t_0 s+1}$$

The solution above, in the frequency domain, characterizes a first-order system with a characteristic time of $t_0$. Thus, the −3 dB gain (cut-off) frequency will be:

$$f_{-3\text{ dB}} = \frac{1}{2\pi t_0}$$

The cut-off frequency and the particle transfer function, plotted on the side panel, allows for the assessment of PIV error in unsteady flow applications and its effect on turbulence spectral quantities and kinetic energy.

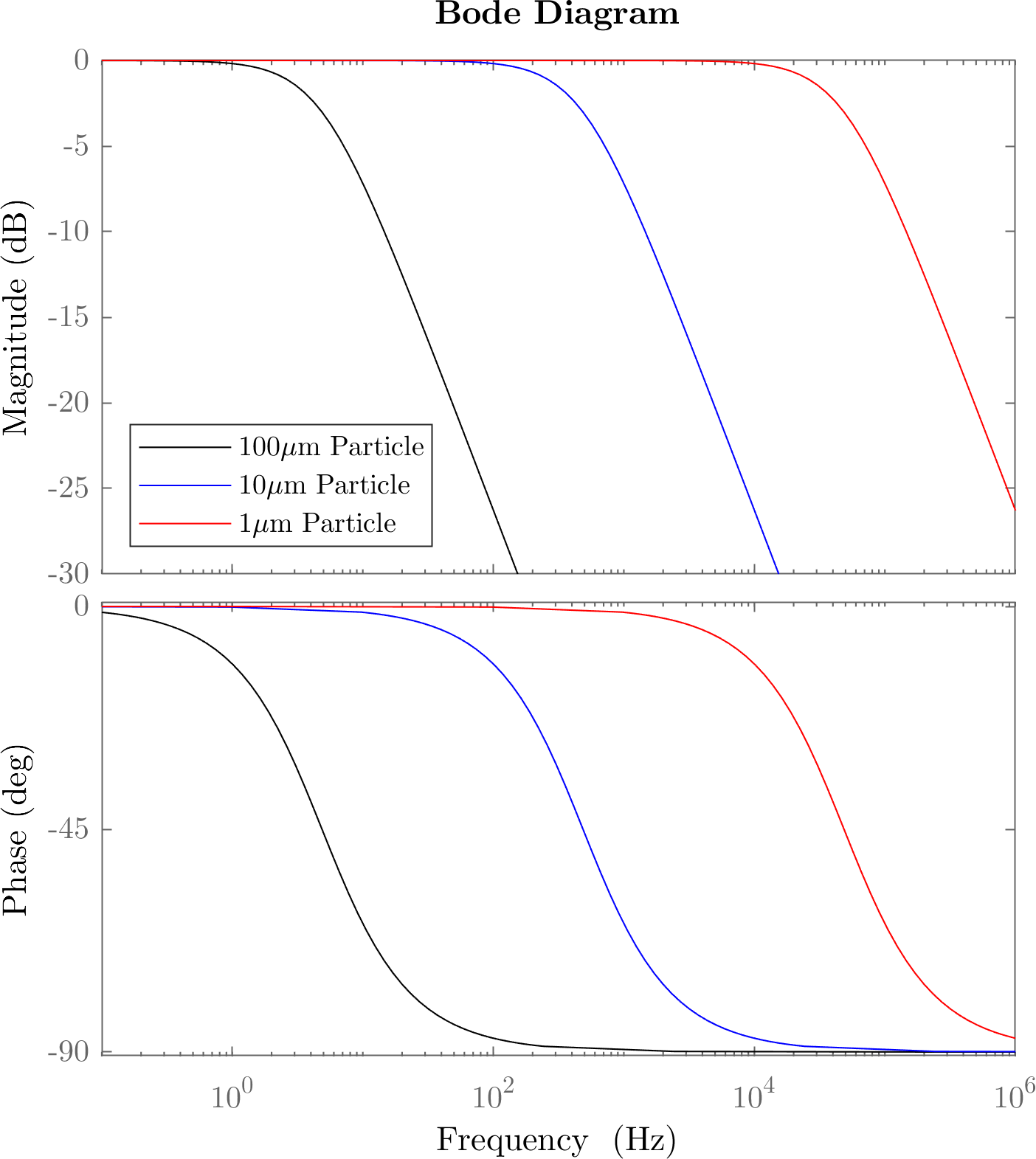
Bode plot of a propylene glycol particle in air for different particle diameters.

== Particles through a shock wave ==
The bias error in particle tracking discussed in the previous section is evident in the frequency domain, but it can be difficult to appreciate in cases where the particle motion is being tracked to perform flow field measurements (like in particle image velocimetry). A simple but insightful solution to the above-mentioned differential equation is possible when the forcing function $v_f(t)=V_{u}-\Delta V H(t)$ is a Heaviside step function; representing particles going through a shockwave. In this case, $V_{u}$ is the flow velocity upstream of the shock; whereas $\Delta V$ is the velocity drop across the shock.

The step response for a particle is a simple exponential:

$$v_p(t) = (V_{u}-\Delta V) + \Delta V e^{-t/t_0}$$

To convert the velocity as a function of time to a particle velocity distribution as a function of distance, let's assume a 1-dimensional velocity jump in the $x$ direction. Let's assume $x=0$ is positioned where the shock wave is, and then integrate the previous equation to get:

$$x_\text{particle} = \int_0^{\Delta t} v_p(t) dt = \int_0^{\Delta t} (V_{u}-\Delta V) dt + \int_0^{\Delta t} \Delta V e^{-t/t_0} dt$$

$$x_\text{particle} = \Delta t (V_{u}-\Delta V) + \Delta t \Delta V (1-e^{-\Delta t/t_0})$$

Considering a relaxation time of $\Delta t=3t_0$ (time to 95% velocity change), we have:

$$x_{\text{particle}, 95\%} = 3t_0 (V_{u}-\Delta V) + 3t_0 \Delta V (1-e^{-3})$$

$$x_{\text{particle}, 95\%} = 3t_0 (V_{u}-0.05\Delta V)$$

This means the particle velocity would be settled to within 5% of the downstream velocity at $x_{\text{particle}, 95\%}$ from the shock. In practice, this means a shock wave would look, to a PIV system, blurred by approximately this $x_{\text{particle}, 95\%}$ distance.

For example, consider a normal shock wave of Mach number $M=2$ at a stagnation temperature of 298 K. A propylene glycol particle of $d_p=1~\mu\text{m}$ would blur the flow by $x_{\text{particle}, 95\%}=5\text{ mm}$; whereas a $d_p=10~\mu\text{m}$ would blur the flow by $x_{\text{particle}, 95\%}=500\text{ mm}$ (which would, in most cases, yield unacceptable PIV results).

Although a shock wave is the worst-case scenario of abrupt deceleration of a flow, it illustrates the effect of particle tracking error in PIV, which results in a blurring of the velocity fields acquired at the length scales of order $x_{\text{particle}, 95\%}$.

== Non-Stokesian drag regime ==
The preceding analysis will not be accurate in the ultra-Stokesian regime. i.e. if the particle Reynolds number is much greater than unity. Assuming a Mach number much less than unity, a generalized form of the Stokes number was demonstrated by Israel & Rosner.

$$\text{Stk}_\text{e} = \text{Stk} \frac{24}{\text{Re}_{o}} \int^{\text{Re}_{o}}_0 \frac{d \text{Re}^{\prime}}{C_D(\text{Re}^{\prime}) \text{Re}^{\prime}}$$

Where $\text{Re}_o$ is the "particle free-stream Reynolds number",

$$\text{Re}_o = \frac{\rho_g |\mathbf{u}| d_p}{\mu_g}$$

An additional function $\psi(\text{Re}_{o})$ was defined by; this describes the non-Stokesian drag correction factor,

$$\text{Stk}_{e} = \text{Stk} \cdot \psi (\text{Re}_{o})$$

It follows that this function is defined by,

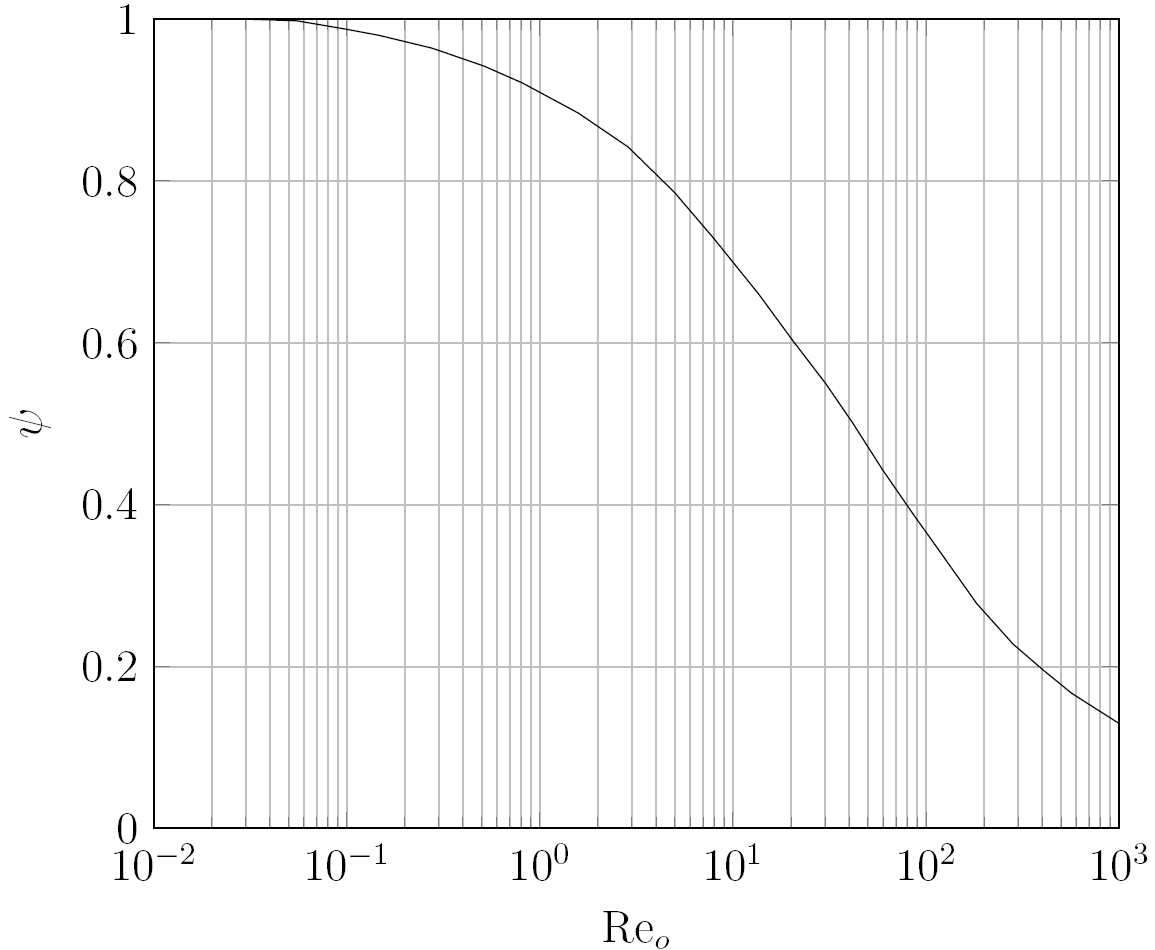
$\psi$ describes the non-Stokesian drag correction factor for a spherical particle

$$\psi (\text{Re}_{o}) = \frac{24}{\text{Re}_{o}} \int^{\text{Re}_{o}}_0 \frac{d \text{Re}^{\prime}}{C_D(\text{Re}^{\prime}) \text{Re}^{\prime}}$$

Considering the limiting particle free-stream Reynolds numbers, as $\text{Re}_{o} \to 0$ then $C_D(\text{Re}_{o}) \to 24 / \text{Re}_{o}$ and therefore $\psi \to 1$. Thus as expected there correction factor is unity in the Stokesian drag regime. Wessel & Righi evaluated $\psi$ for $C_D(\text{Re})$ from the empirical correlation for drag on a sphere from Schiller & Naumann.

$$\psi(\text{Re}_{o}) = \frac{3(\sqrt{c}\text{Re}_{o}^{1/3}-\arctan(\sqrt{c}\text{Re}_{o}^{1/3}))}{c^{3/2}\text{Re}_{o}}$$

Where the constant $c = 0.158$. The conventional Stokes number will significantly underestimate the drag force for large particle free-stream Reynolds numbers. Thus overestimating the tendency for particles to depart from the fluid flow direction. This will lead to errors in subsequent calculations or experimental comparisons.

== Application to anisokinetic sampling of particles ==
For example, the selective capture of particles by an aligned, thin-walled circular nozzle is given by Belyaev and Levin as:

$$c / c_0 = 1 + (u_{0} / u -1) \left(1-\frac{1}{1 + \mathrm{Stk} (2 + 0.617 u / u_{0})}\right)$$

where $c$ is particle concentration, $u$ is speed, and the subscript 0 indicates conditions far upstream of the nozzle. The characteristic distance is the diameter of the nozzle. Here the Stokes number is calculated,

$$\mathrm{Stk} = \frac{u_{0} V_{s}}{d g}$$

where $V_{s}$ is the particle's settling velocity, $d$ is the sampling tube's inner diameter, and $g$ is the acceleration of gravity.

== See also ==
- Stokes' law – For the drag force in fluids on particles whose Reynolds number is less than one
