= Edgar Buckingham =

American physicist

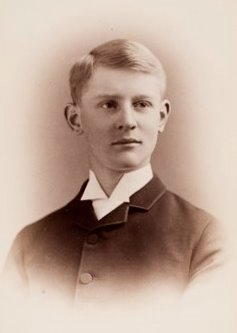
- Buckingham in c. 1886
- Born: July 8, 1867; Philadelphia, Pennsylvania
- Died: April 29, 1940 (aged 72); Washington, D.C.
- Education: Harvard University; University of Leipzig
- Known for: Buckingham π theorem
- Scientific career
- Fields: Physics
- Workplaces: National Bureau of Standards
- Doctoral advisor: Wilhelm Ostwald

Edgar Buckingham (July 8, 1867 in Philadelphia, Pennsylvania – April 29, 1940 in Washington DC) was an American physicist.

He graduated from Harvard University with a bachelor's degree in physics in 1887. He did graduate work at Strasbourg and then studied under the chemist Wilhelm Ostwald at Leipzig, from which he was granted a PhD in 1893. He worked as a soil physicist at the USDA Bureau of Soils from 1902 to 1906. He worked at the (US) National Bureau of Standards (now the National Institute of Standards and Technology, or NIST) 1906–1937. His fields of expertise included soil physics, gas properties, acoustics, fluid mechanics, and blackbody radiation. He is also the originator of the Buckingham π theorem in the field of dimensional analysis.

In 1923, Buckingham published a report which voiced skepticism that jet propulsion would be economically competitive with propeller driven aircraft at low altitudes and at the speeds of that period.

Buckingham's first work on soil physics is on soil aeration, particularly the loss of carbon dioxide from the soil and its subsequent replacement by oxygen. From his experiments he found that the rate of gas diffusion in soil was not dependent significantly on the soil structure, compactness or water content of the soil. Using an empirical formula based on his data, Buckingham was able to give the diffusion coefficient as a function of air content. This relation is still commonly cited in many modern textbooks and used in modern research. The outcomes of his research on gas transport were to conclude that the exchange of gases in soil aeration takes place by diffusion and is sensibly independent of the variations of the outside barometric pressure.

Buckingham then worked on soil water, research for which he is now renowned. Buckingham's work on soil water is published in Bulletin 38 USDA Bureau of Soils: Studies on the movement of soil moisture, which was released in 1907. This document contained three sections, the first of which looked at evaporation of water from below a layer of soil. He found that soils of various textures could strongly inhibit evaporation, particularly where capillary flow through the uppermost layers was prevented. The second section of Bulletin 38 looked at the drying of soils under arid and humid conditions. Buckingham found evaporative losses were initially higher from the arid soil, then after three days the evaporation under arid conditions became less than under humid conditions, with the total loss ending up greater from the humid soil. Buckingham believed this occurred due to the self-mulching behaviour (he referred to it as the soil forming a natural mulch) exhibited by the soil under arid conditions.

The third section of Bulletin 38 contains the work on unsaturated flow and capillary action for which Buckingham is famous. He firstly recognized the importance of the potential of the forces arising from interactions between soil and water. He called this the capillary potential, this is now known as the moisture or water potential (matric potential). He combined capillary theory and an energy potential in soil physics theory, and was the first to expound the dependence of soil hydraulic conductivity on capillary potential. This dependence later came to be known as relative permeability in petroleum engineering. He also applied a formula equivalent to Darcy's law to unsaturated flow.

== Life and achievements ==
- 1867 – Born in Philadelphia, Pennsylvania, on July 8
- 1887 – Graduated from Harvard with a degree in physics
- 1893 – Received a Ph.D. from the University of Leipzig
- 1893 – Began teaching physical chemistry and physics at Bryn Mawr College
- 1897–1899 – Wrote a textbook on thermodynamics
- 1899 – Left Bryn Mawr and worked at a mining camp in Morenci, Arizona
- 1901 – Married Elizabeth Holstein in Texas
- 1901 – Started as an instructor in physics at the University of Wisconsin
- 1902–1906 – Worked at the USDA Bureau of Soils, where he wrote and published two papers on the dynamics of gas and water in soils.
- 1907 – Began working at the National Bureau of Standards (NBS)
- 1917, served as president of the Philosophical Society of Washington
- 1918–1919 – Worked a stint as associate science attaché to the U.S. Embassy in Rome
- 1923 – First NBS researcher to be given independent status, meaning he was freed of all administrative duties
- 1937 – Retired from the NBS at the mandatory age of 70, however continued to work there on research problems
- 1940 – Died in Washington DC on April 29
