= Dimensionless quantity =

Physical quantity with no units

Dimensionless quantities, or quantities of dimension one, are quantities with no associated units of measurement. These may be ratios of quantities with the same physical units or ratios of dimensionally equal products with identical units. For instance, alcohol by volume (ABV) represents a volumetric ratio; its value remains independent of the specific units of volume used, such as in milliliters per milliliter (mL/mL).

The number one has been suggested as a dimensionless base quantity. Radians serve as dimensionless units for angular measurements, derived from the universal ratio of 2π times the radius of a circle being equal to its circumference.

In the International System of Quantities, certain well established dimensionless quantities are called characteristic numbers, resulting from the combination of characteristic quantities, such as characteristic length, characteristic time, etc.

Physics relies on dimensionless numbers like the Reynolds number in fluid dynamics, the fine-structure constant in quantum mechanics, and the Lorentz factor in relativity. In chemistry, state properties and ratios such as mole fractions (as concentration ratios) are dimensionless. Mathematics texts commonly omit units, making quantities like area and length appear to be dimensionless.

== History ==
Quantities having dimension 1, dimensionless quantities, regularly occur in sciences, and are formally treated within the field of dimensional analysis. In the 19th century, French mathematician Joseph Fourier and Scottish physicist James Clerk Maxwell led significant developments in the modern concepts of dimension and unit. Later work by British physicists Osborne Reynolds and Lord Rayleigh contributed to the understanding of dimensionless numbers in physics. Building on Rayleigh's method of dimensional analysis, Edgar Buckingham proved the π theorem (independently of French mathematician Joseph Bertrand's previous work) to formalize the nature of these quantities.

Numerous dimensionless numbers, mostly ratios, were coined in the early 1900s, particularly in the areas of fluid mechanics and heat transfer. Measuring logarithm of ratios as levels in the (derived) unit decibel (dB) finds widespread use nowadays.

There have been periodic proposals to "patch" the SI system to reduce confusion regarding physical dimensions. For example, a 2017 op-ed in Nature argued for formalizing the radian as a physical unit. The idea was rebutted on the grounds that such a change would raise inconsistencies for both established dimensionless groups, like the Strouhal number, and for mathematically distinct entities that happen to have the same units, like torque (a vector product) versus energy (a scalar product). In another instance in the early 2000s, the International Committee for Weights and Measures discussed naming the unit of 1 as the "uno", but the idea of just introducing a new SI name for 1 was dropped.

== Buckingham π theorem ==
The Buckingham π theorem is the fundamental theorem of dimensional analysis. Introduced in 1914 by Edgar Buckingham, the theorem indicates that validity of the laws of physics do not depend on a specific unit system. A statement of this theorem is that any physical law can be expressed as an identity involving only combinations (ratios or products) of dimensionless quantities linked by the law (e.g., pressure and volume are linked by Boyle's law – they are inversely proportional).

Another consequence of the theorem is that the functional dependence between a certain number (say, n) of variables can be reduced by the number (say, k) of independent dimensions occurring in those variables to give a set of p = n − k independent, dimensionless quantities. For the purposes of the experimenter, different systems that share the same description by dimensionless quantity are equivalent.

== Integers ==
Number of entities
- Common symbols: N
- SI unit: Unitless
- Dimension: 1

Integer numbers may represent dimensionless quantities. They can represent discrete quantities, which can also be dimensionless. More specifically, counting numbers can be used to express countable quantities. The concept is formalized as quantity number of entities (symbol N) in ISO 80000-1. Examples include number of particles and population size. In mathematics, the "number of elements" in a set is termed cardinality. Countable nouns is a related linguistics concept. Counting numbers, such as number of bits, can be compounded with units of frequency (inverse second) to derive units of count rate, such as bits per second. Count data is a related concept in statistics. The concept may be generalized by allowing non-integer numbers to account for fractions of a full item, e.g., number of turns equal to one half.

== Ratios, proportions, and angles ==
Dimensionless quantities can be obtained as ratios of quantities that are not dimensionless, but whose dimensions cancel out in the mathematical operation. Examples of quotients of dimension one include calculating slopes or some unit conversion factors. Another set of examples is mass fractions or mole fractions, often written using parts-per notation such as ppm (= 10^{−6}), ppb (= 10^{−9}), and ppt (= 10^{−12}), or perhaps confusingly as ratios of two identical units (kg/kg or mol/mol). For example, alcohol by volume, which characterizes the concentration of ethanol in an alcoholic beverage, could be written as mL / 100 mL.

Other common proportions are percentages % (= 0.01), ‰ (= 0.001). Some angle units such as turn, radian, and steradian are defined as ratios of quantities of the same kind. In statistics the coefficient of variation is the ratio of the standard deviation to the mean and is used to measure the dispersion in the data.

It has been argued that quantities defined as ratios Q = A/B having equal dimensions in numerator and denominator are actually only unitless quantities and still have physical dimension defined as dim Q = dim A × dim B^{−1}. For example, moisture content may be defined as a ratio of volumes (volumetric moisture, m^{3}⋅m^{−3}, dimension L^{3}⋅L^{−3}) or as a ratio of masses (gravimetric moisture, units kg⋅kg^{−1}, dimension M⋅M^{−1}); both would be unitless quantities, but of different dimension. Alternatively, the dimension may be denoted raising the dividend's dimension to zeroth power, as in (L^{3})^{0} or M^{0}.

== Categories ==
Dimensionless quantities can be grouped into:

- Physical similarity criteria from similarity theory analysis. For example, Reynolds number, the ratio of force of viscosity to inertia, appears in the analysis of fluid flow.
- dimensionless physical constants, and
- approximate ratios from experiments which may have a limited scope of application.

== Dimensionless physical constants ==
A set of fundamental dimensionless constants determine a given physical theory. Such constants cannot be explained by the theory and must be measured experimentally and verified to be constant in experiments.

== List ==
=== Physics and engineering ===
- engineering strain, a measure of physical deformation defined as a change in length divided by the initial length.
- fine-structure constant, α ≈ 1/137 which characterizes the magnitude of the electromagnetic interaction between electrons.
- β (or μ) ≈ 1836, the proton-to-electron mass ratio. This ratio is the rest mass of the proton divided by that of the electron. An analogous ratio can be defined for any elementary particle.
- Strong force coupling strength α_{s} ≈ 1.
- The tensor-to-scalar ratio $r$, a ratio between the contributions of tensor and scalar modes to the primordial power spectrum observed in the CMB.
- The Immirzi-Barbero parameter $\gamma$, which characterizes the area gap in loop quantum gravity.
- emissivity, which is the ratio of actual emitted radiation from a surface to that of an idealized surface at the same temperature
- Lorentz factor – parameter used in the context of special relativity for time dilation, length contraction, and relativistic effects between observers moving at different velocities
- Fresnel number – wavenumber (spatial frequency) over distance
- Beta (plasma physics) – ratio of plasma pressure to magnetic pressure, used in magnetospheric physics as well as fusion plasma physics.
- Thiele modulus – describes the relationship between diffusion and reaction rate in porous catalyst pellets with no mass transfer limitations.
- Numerical aperture – characterizes the range of angles over which the system can accept or emit light.
- Zukoski number, usually noted $Q^*$, is the ratio of the heat release rate of a fire to the enthalpy of the gas flow rate circulating through the fire. Accidental and natural fires usually have a $Q^* \approx 1$. Flat spread fires such as forest fires have $Q^*<1$. Fires originating from pressured vessels or pipes, with additional momentum caused by pressure, have $Q^*\gg 1$.

=== Chemistry ===
- Relative density – density relative to water
- Relative atomic mass, Standard atomic weight
- Equilibrium constant (which is sometimes dimensionless)
- pH

=== Other fields ===
- Cost of transport is the efficiency in moving from one place to another
- Elasticity is the measurement of the proportional change of an economic variable in response to a change in another
- Basic reproduction number is a dimensionless ratio used in epidemiology to quantify the transmissibility of an infection.

== See also ==
- List of dimensionless quantities
- Arbitrary unit
- Dimensional analysis
- Normalization (statistics) and standardized moment, the analogous concepts in statistics
- Orders of magnitude (numbers)
- Similitude (model)
