= Powder =

Dry, bulk solid composed of fine, free-flowing particles

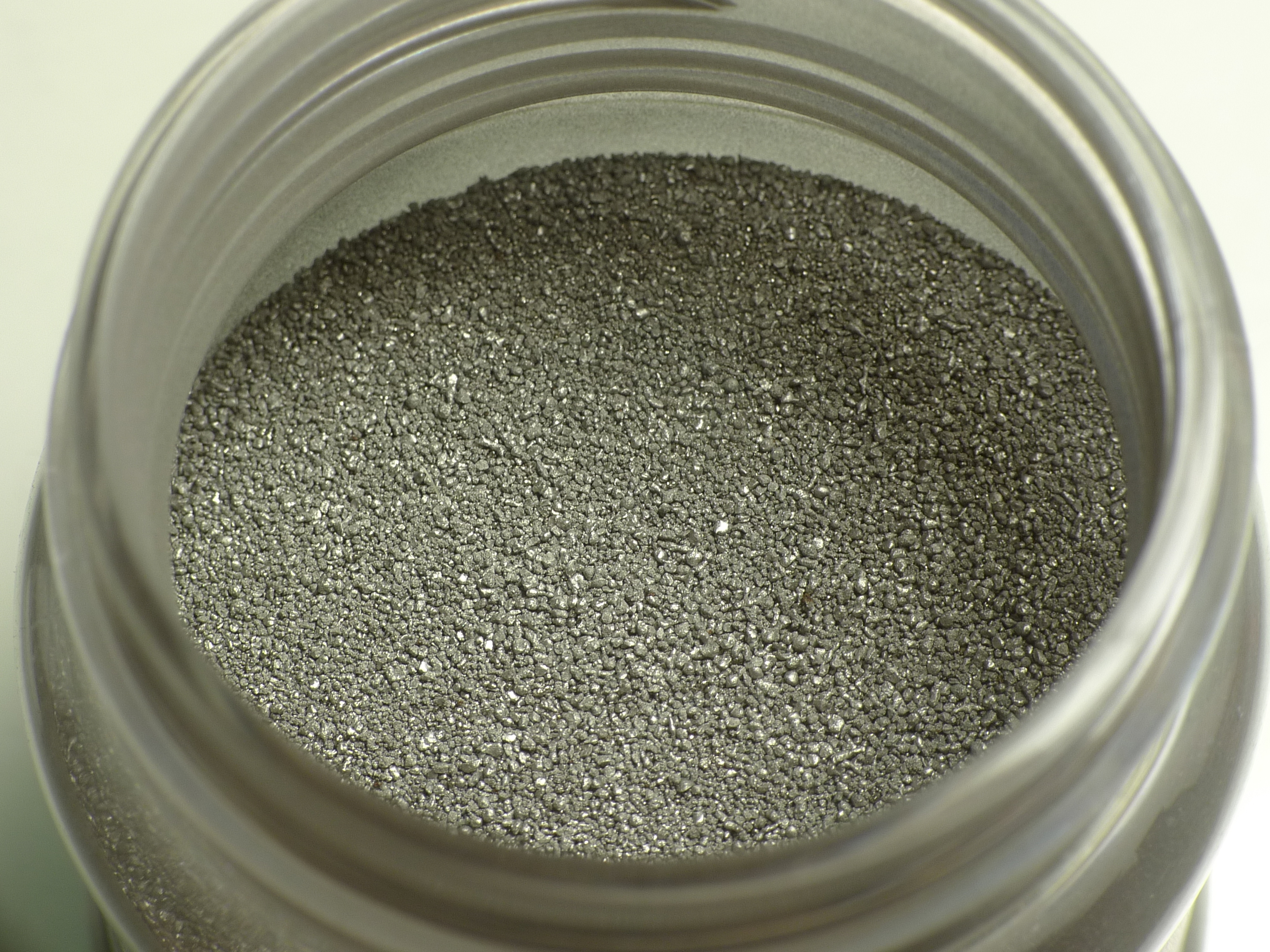
Iron powder

A powder is a dry solid composed of many very fine particles that may flow freely when shaken or tilted. Powders are a special sub-class of granular materials, although the terms powder and granular are sometimes used to distinguish separate classes of material. In particular, powders refer to those granular materials that have the finer grain sizes, and that therefore have a greater tendency to form clumps when flowing. Granulars refer to the coarser granular materials that do not tend to form clumps except when wet.

== Types ==
Many manufactured goods come in powder form, such as flour, sugar, ground coffee, powdered milk, copy machine toner, gunpowder, cosmetic powders, and some pharmaceuticals. In nature, dust, fine sand and snow, volcanic ash, and the top layer of the lunar regolith are also examples.

Because of their importance to industry, medicine and earth science, powders have been studied in great detail by chemical engineers, mechanical engineers, chemists, physicists, geologists, and researchers in other disciplines.

== Mechanical properties ==
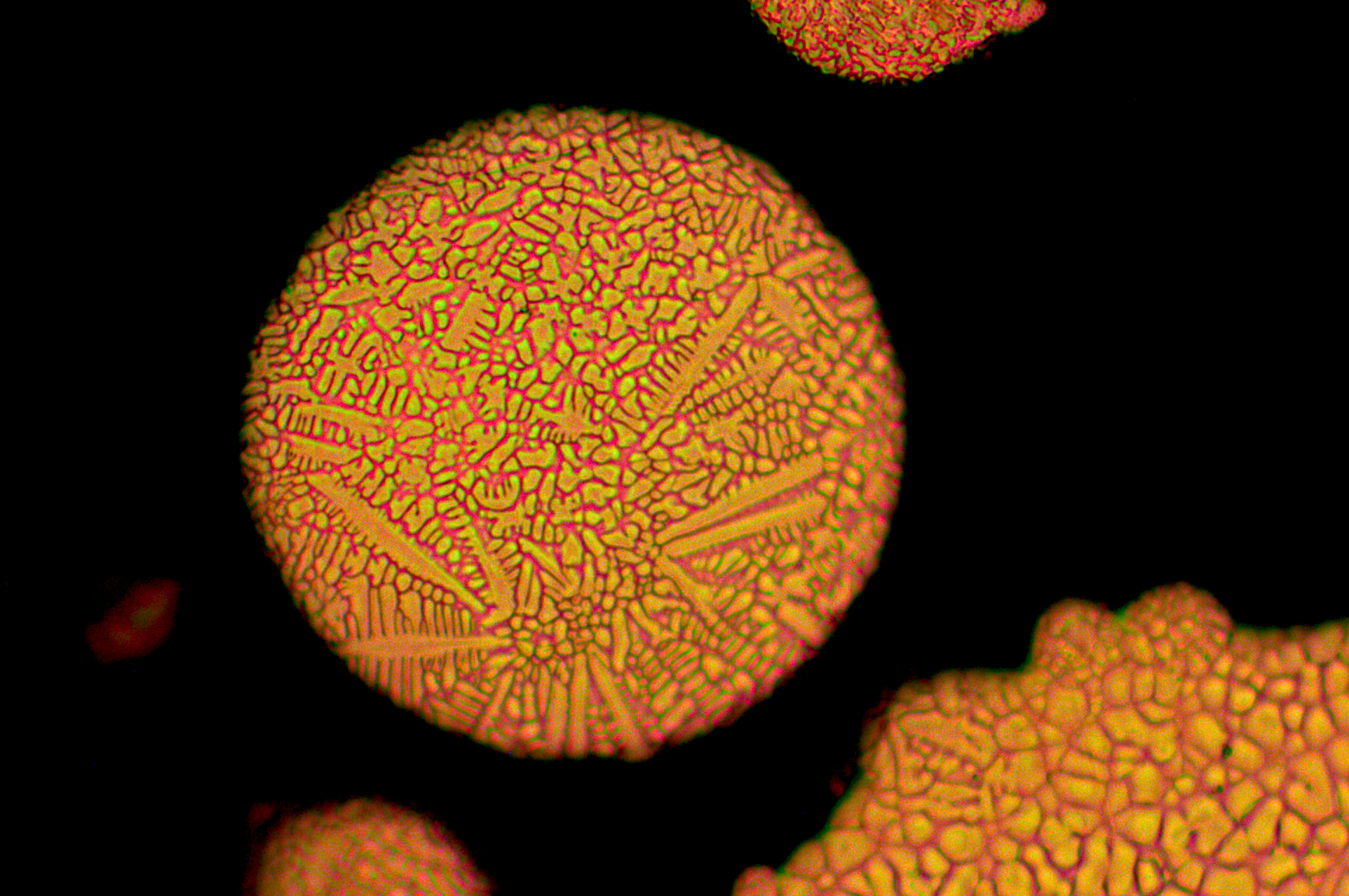
Microstructure of a steel powder particle (image 0.15 mm wide)

Typically, a powder can be compacted or loosened into a vastly larger range of bulk densities than can a coarser granular material. When deposited by sprinkling, a powder may be very light and fluffy. When vibrated or compressed it may become very dense and even lose its ability to flow. The bulk density of coarse sand, on the other hand, does not vary over an appreciable range.

The clumping behavior of a powder arises because of the molecular Van der Waals force that causes individual grains to cling to one another. This force is present not just in powders, but in sand and gravel, too. However, in such coarse granular materials the weight and the inertia of the individual grains are much larger than the very weak Van der Waals forces, and therefore the tiny clinging between grains does not have a dominant effect on the bulk behavior of the material. Only when the grains are very small and lightweight does the Van der Waals force become predominant, causing the material to clump like a powder. The cross-oversize between flow conditions and stick conditions can be determined by simple experimentation.

Many other powder behaviors are common to all granular materials. These include segregation, stratification, jamming and unjamming, fragility, loss of kinetic energy, frictional shearing, compaction and Reynolds' dilatancy.

== Transport ==
Powders are transported in the atmosphere differently from a coarse granular material. For one thing, tiny particles have little inertia compared to the drag force of the gas that surrounds them, and so they tend to go with the flow instead of traveling in straight lines. For this reason, powders may be an inhalation hazard. Larger particles cannot weave through the body's defenses in the nose and sinus, but will strike and stick to the mucous membranes. The body then moves the mucus out of the body to expel the particles. The smaller particles on the other hand can travel all the way to the lungs from which they cannot be expelled. Serious and sometimes fatal diseases such as silicosis are a result from working with certain powders without adequate respiratory protection.

Also, if powder particles are sufficiently small, they may become suspended in the atmosphere for a very long time. Random motion of the air molecules and turbulence provide upward forces that may counteract the downward force of gravity. Coarse granulars, on the other hand, are so heavy that they fall immediately back to the ground. Once disturbed, dust may form huge dust storms that cross continents and oceans before settling back to the surface. This explains why there is relatively little hazardous dust in the natural environment. Once aloft, the dust is very likely to stay aloft until it meets water in the form of rain or a body of water. Then it sticks and is washed downstream to settle as mud deposits in a quiet lake or sea. When geological changes later re-expose these deposits to the atmosphere, they may have already cemented together to become mudstone, a type of rock. For comparison, the Moon has neither wind nor water, and so its regolith contains dust but no mudstone.

The cohesive forces between the particles tend to resist their becoming airborne, and the motion of wind across the surface is less likely to disturb a low-lying dust particle than a larger sand grain that protrudes higher into the wind. Mechanical agitation such as vehicle traffic, digging or passing herds of animals is more effective than a steady wind at stirring up a powder.

The aerodynamic properties of powders are often used to transport them in industrial applications. Pneumatic conveying is the transport of powders or grains through a pipe by blowing gas. A gas fluidized bed is a container filled with a powder or granular substance that is fluffed up by blowing gas upwardly through it. This is used for fluidized bed combustion, chemically reacting the gas with the powder.

Some powders may be dustier than others. The tendency of a powder to generate particles in the air under a given energy input is called "dustiness". It is an important powder property which is relevant to powder aerosolization. It also has implications for human exposure to aerosolized particles and the associated health risks (via skin contact or inhalation) in workplaces.

== Explosion risk ==
Many common powders made in industry are combustible; particularly metals or organic materials such as flour. Since powders have a very high surface area, they can combust with explosive force once ignited. Facilities such as flour mills can be vulnerable to such explosions without proper dust mitigation efforts.

Some metals become especially dangerous in powdered form, notably titanium and magnesium.

== Comparison with other substances ==
A paste or gel might become a powder after it has been thoroughly dried, but is not considered a powder when it is wet because it does not flow freely. Substances like dried clay, although dry bulk solids composed of very fine particles, are not powders unless they are crushed because they have too much cohesion between the grains, and therefore they do not flow freely like a powder. A liquid flows differently than a powder, because a liquid cannot resist any shear stress and therefore it cannot reside at a tilted angle without flowing (that is, it has zero angle of repose.) A powder on the other hand is a solid, not a liquid, because it may support shear stresses and therefore may display an angle of repose.

== See also ==
- Fragile matter
- Granular material
- Liquefaction
- Grain size
- Paste (rheology)
- Powder mixture
