= Eric Weeks =

American physicist (born 1970)

Eric R. Weeks
- Born: May , 1970; Downers Grove, Illinois, U.S.
- Education: University of Texas at Austin; University of Illinois at Urbana-Champaign
- Known for: Contributions in the fields of Confocal Microscopy, Colloidal Glasses, Soft Condensed Matter Physics, Jamming (physics), Microrheology, Particle Tracking, and Granular Materials.
- Awards: Presidential Early Career Award for Scientists and Engineers (PECASE), American Physical Society Outstanding Referee (inaugural group) (2008)
- Scientific career
- Fields: Physics
- Workplaces: Emory University
- Doctoral advisor: Harry Swinney

Eric R. Weeks (born 1970 in Downers Grove, Illinois) is an American physicist. He completed his B.Sc. at the University of Illinois at Urbana–Champaign in 1992. He obtained a Ph.D. in physics from the University of Texas at Austin in 1997, working under Harry Swinney, and later completed post-doctoral research with David Weitz and Arjun Yodh at Harvard University and the University of Pennsylvania. He is currently a full professor at Emory University in Atlanta, Georgia (as of September 2010).

He is most well known for his work on various aspects of the jamming (physics) phenomenon, specifically in colloidal glasses and colloidal supercooled liquids, although his research interests extend broadly into other types of complex fluids, as well as microrheology and granular materials. During his PhD in Texas, he studied Nonlinear Dynamics.

In 2011, he was elected a Fellow of the American Physical Society.
