= Karen E. Daniels =

American physicist

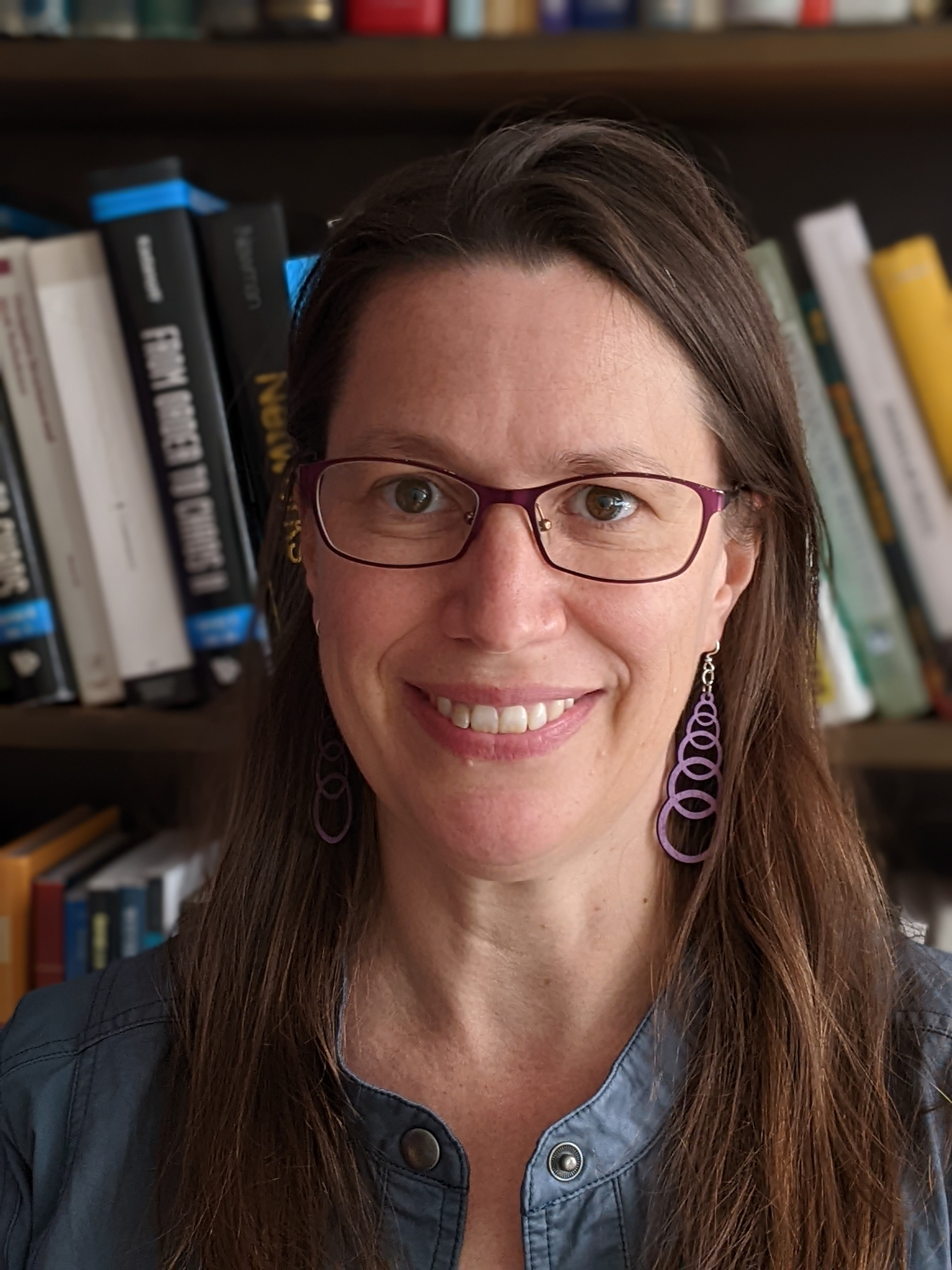
- Daniels in May 2022
- Education: Dartmouth College; Cornell University
- Known for: Advances in experimental probes of the structure and mechanics of granular materials.
- Awards: Fellow of the APS (2018) Fellow of the AAAS (2021) NCSU Equity for Women (2015)
- Scientific career
- Fields: Experimental Physics, Soft Matter, Granular Materials
- Workplaces: North Carolina State University, Duke University
- Thesis: Pattern Formation and Dynamics in Inclined Layer Convection
- Doctoral advisor: Eberhard Bodenschatz
- Other academic advisors: Mary Hudson, Robert Behringer
- Website: danielslab.physics.ncsu.edu/people/karen-daniels/

Karen E. Daniels is an American physicist who is a professor of physics at North Carolina State University. Her research considers the deformation and failure of materials. She is a Fellow of the American Physical Society, and serves on their Committee on the Status of Women in Physics. She is also a Fellow of the American Association for the Advancement of Science.

== Early life and education ==
Daniels completed a bachelor's degree in physics at Dartmouth College in 1994. She originally planned to study engineering. After graduating, Daniels spent three years as a physics teacher at Saint Ann's School. Daniels joined Cornell University as a graduate student, earning a PhD in 2002. She was a postdoctoral research associate at Duke University, working on jamming transitions. At Duke University, Daniels developed a technique that can make a container of granules arrange into a solid-state crystal (freeze) or into a fluid (melt) by changing the rate at which they are shaken.

== Research and career ==
Daniels joined North Carolina State University as an assistant professor in 2005. She is interested in how materials compress, stretch and bend when a force is applied. She specializes in granular materials and their force chains, and how networks within granular materials control their bulk properties. She developed a way to monitor whether granular materials reach a thermodynamic equilibrium, using plastic granules.

In 2011, Daniels spent a year as an Alexander von Humboldt Foundation fellow at the Max Planck Institute for Dynamics and Self-Organization in Göttingen, coordinating a workshop on complex system's: "Particulate Matter: Does Dimensionality Matter." She worked with Haverford College to study the naturally arising sound waves of granular materials. When the materials experience shear stress, the vibrating grains start to stick to the interface. When the stress becomes too much, several grains slip at once, rearranging into new patterns. The stick-slip transition is accompanied by low-frequency vibrational modes. She demonstrated that sound passes through the areas of a material where particles are tightest together. Her lab team have investigated how space missions could explore asteroids. She was supported by NASA to conduct experiments in zero gravity, and took a group of undergraduates to Zero Gravity Corporation. She has also looked at liquid metals, and demonstrated that applying a low voltage to eutectic gallium-indium can cause it to form snowflake-like crystals.

Daniels is on the editorial board of Physical Review Letters. She serves on the American Physical Society Topical Group on Soft Matter committee. Daniels has been involved with activities to increase the representation of women in physics since the start of her career. She is part of the North Carolina State University NSF ADVANCE award "Developing Diverse Departments".

== Awards and honors ==
- 2007 National Science Foundation CAREER Award
- 2011 Alexander von Humboldt Foundation Fellowship
- 2013 North Carolina State University LeRoy and Elva Martin Award for Teaching Excellence
- 2015 North Carolina State University Equity for Women Award
- 2017 Physical Review Letters Outstanding Referee
- 2018 Fellow of the American Physical Society
- 2021 Fellow of the American Association for the Advancement of Science
