= Douglas Durian =

American researcher

- Education: Cornell University; University of Chicago
- Awards: Fellow of the American Physical Society (2004); Sigma Xi Distinguished Lecturer (2003)
- Scientific career
- Fields: Physics; Soft Matter; Jamming; Foams
- Workplaces: University of Pennsylvania University of California Los Angeles Exxon

Douglas J. Durian is Professor of Physics and Astronomy at the University of Pennsylvania. He is known for his research contributions to the field of experimental soft matter, particularly in the areas of foams and granular flows. He has held multiple visiting professorships and leaderships positions in the soft matter physics community. He is a Fellow of the American Physical Society.

== Academic career ==
Durian went to college at the University of Chicago, where he earned an A.B. in Physics and completed the coursework for a degree in Applied Mathematics in 1984. He received an M.S. in physics from Cornell in 1987, and a Ph.D. in physics from Cornell in 1989 with Carl Franck. His thesis research focused on the wetting properties of binary liquid mixtures. Before joining the University of California Los Angeles in 1991 as an assistant professor of physics, he was a postdoctoral fellow at Exxon Research and Engineering Company from 1989 to 1991 under the supervision of David Weitz. After becoming a full professor at UCLA, he moved to the University of Pennsylvania in 2004 and has been there ever since. He held multiple visiting positions including at the Universite Louis Pasteur, ESPCI Paris, and the Kavli Institute for Theoretical Physics.

Durian was Chair of the American Physical Society Division of Soft Matter in 2019, and was a member-at-large in the APS Topical Group on Statistical and Nonlinear Physics from 2005 to 2008. He served as the associate editor of Research Letter in Physics from 2007 to 2017, and has been on the editorial boards of npj Microgravity since 2014, the Journal of Statistical Mechanics: Theory and Experiment since 2017, and Papers in Physics since 2019.

== Research contributions ==
Durian has broad interests in soft matter composed of particulates, ranging from colloids and bubbles to grains and pebbles. His early experimental work on aqueous foams, as well as his models for simulating the loss of rigidity, helped launch the field of jamming. In granular systems, he has developed well controlled experimental systems that allow precise study of key phenomena associated with jamming, such as dynamical heterogeneities and the thermal-like nature of grain-scale fluctuations in driven systems, as well as the forces at play during impact, and the nature of the putative clogging transition that happens for grains in a hopper when the outlet size is decreased. He has also developed models with regards to the coarsening of foam structure, driven by diffusion of gas from small to large bubbles, where the role of bubble shape and liquid content is uncovered through a combination of ground and microgravity experiments aboard the International Space Station. Durian's work leverages his advances in multiple light scattering techniques for probing the structure and dynamics of opaque materials, including new methods of higher-order correlation functions and speckle-visibility spectroscopy. He is also using model experimental systems and machine learning techniques to help understand the mechanical response of amorphous solids.

According to his Google Scholar profile, Durian's publications have received over 11,000 citations and his h-index is 57.

== Awards and honors ==
Durian has received a significant number of awards and honors which include:

- Fellow, American Physical Society (2004)
- Sigma Xi Distinguished Lecturer (2003-2005)
- UCLA Outstanding Teacher Award (1995-1996)
- UCLA Academic Senate Faculty Career Development Award (1994-1995)

== Personal life ==
Durian was born and raised in Kalamazoo, Michigan. His father was a lifetime employee of General Motors. He is married to Andrea J. Liu.
