= Paste (rheology) =

In physics, a paste is a substance that behaves as a solid until a sufficiently large load or stress is applied, at which point it flows like a fluid. In rheological terms, a paste is an example of a Bingham plastic fluid.

Pastes typically consist of a suspension of granular material in a background fluid. The individual grains are jammed together like sand on a beach, forming a disordered, glassy or amorphous structure, and giving pastes their solid-like character. It is this "jamming together" that gives pastes some of their most unusual properties; this causes paste to demonstrate properties of fragile matter.

Examples include starch pastes, toothpaste, mustard, and putty.

In pharmacology, paste is a basic pharmaceutical form. It consists of a fatty base (e.g., petroleum jelly) and at least 25% of a solid substance (e.g., zinc oxide). Pharmaceutical pastes are typically intended for external application to the skin. They are usually thick and do not melt at physiologic temperatures.
