= Amy Rowat =

Canadian biophysicist

- Education: Mount Allison University (BS); Technical University of Denmark (MS); University of Southern Denmark (PhD)
- Awards: NSF CAREER Award (2013); NSF BRITE Fellow (2022)
- Scientific career
- Fields: Biophysics; Physics; Bioengineering
- Institutions: University of California, Los Angeles
- Doctoral advisor: Ole Mouritsen

Amy Rowat is an Associate Professor of biophysics at the University of California in Los Angeles (UCLA) and the first Marcie H. Rothman Presidential Chair in Food Studies. Her scientific research focuses on understanding the physical and mechanical properties of cells in diseases such as cancer. She also organizes public events on the science of cooking.

Rowat is the recipient of several awards including the National Science Foundation (NSF) BRITE Fellow award (2022), the NSF CAREER Award (2013), and the UCLA Distinguished Teaching Award with distinction for Undergraduate Mentorship (2021).

== Early life and education ==
Amy Rowat grew up in Guelph, Ontario. She completed a B.Sc. in Physics and a B.A. (Asian Studies, French and Math) at Mount Allison University. After her bachelor studies, she studied at the Technical University of Denmark (M.Sc. Chemistry) and the University of Southern Denmark (Ph.D. Physics). For her graduate work, she studied under Ole Mouritsen, investigating the mechanical properties of the nuclear envelope and nuclear membrane. After completing her Ph.D., she moved to Boston to work with David Weitz at Harvard. In the lab of Weitz, she developed her expertise in microfluidics and filed three patent applications on novel microfluidic technologies.

== Research and career ==
Rowat studies the mechanical phenotypes of various cell types including immune-type cells and cancerous cells. These types of cells can demonstrate changes in their shape, size, and deformability in diseased states. For example, irregularities in the shape of the cell nucleus can be used as biomarkers to diagnose the presence of diseases like breast cancer. Rowat is currently developing high-throughput techniques with microfluidic devices to image and measure deformability in various cell types.

== Science and Food ==
Amy Rowat is the founder and director of Science and Food, a non-profit organization at UCLA. The organization aims to use food to introduce complex topics in physics and chemistry to scientists and nonscientists alike. One part of the organization is a chef-in-residence program that allows students to learn from chefs in a teaching kitchen. Along with other professors in the Science and Food organization, Rowat teaches a course in which students explore the parallels in food and science through cooking.

Rowat's lab is researching solutions for sustainable food production. One problem she is tackling is understanding the mechanical cues for cell growth, which may translate to better scaffolds for plant-derived meats.
