= Durian (surname) =

Durian is a surname. It can refer to:

- Douglas Durian, US professor of physics and astronomy at the University of Pennsylvania
- Guido Durian, researcher
- Jorge Durian (b. 1975), Brazilian singer
- Ohan Durian (Օհան Դուրյան; 1922–2011), Armenian conductor and composer
- Saskia Durian-Ress (b. 1943), German art historian
- Sibylle Durian (b. 1946), German author
- Wolf Durian (1892–1969), German author

== See also ==
- Duran (surname)
