= Diffusing-wave spectroscopy =

Diffusing-wave spectroscopy (DWS) is an optical technique derived from dynamic light scattering (DLS) that studies the dynamics of scattered light in the limit of strong multiple scattering. It has been widely used in the past to study colloidal suspensions, emulsions, foams, gels, biological media and other forms of soft matter. If carefully calibrated, DWS allows the quantitative measurement of microscopic motion in a soft material, from which the rheological properties of the complex medium can be extracted via the microrheology approach.

== One-speckle diffusing-wave spectroscopy ==
Laser light is sent to the sample and the outcoming transmitted or backscattered light is detected by an optoelectric sensor. The light intensity detected is the result of the interference of all the optical waves coming from the different light paths.

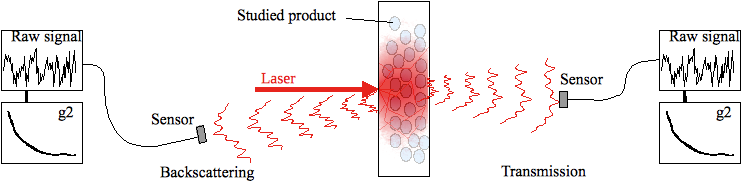
Typical setup of diffusing-wave spectroscopy

The signal is analysed by calculating the intensity autocorrelation function called g_{2}. $g_2(\tau)=\frac{\langle I(t)I(t+\tau)\rangle_t}{\langle I(t)\rangle_t^2}$

For the case of non-interacting particles suspended in a (complex) fluid a direct relation between g_{2}-1 and the mean squared displacement of the particles <Δr^{2}> can be established. Let us note P(s) the probability density function (PDF) of the photon path length s. The relation can be written as follows:

$g_2(\tau)-1=[\int {ds P(s) \exp(-(s/l*)k_0^2 \langle\Delta r^2(\tau)\rangle) }]^2$

with $k_0=\frac{2\pi n}{\lambda}$ and $l*$ is the transport mean free path of scattered light.

For simple cell geometries, it is thus possible to calculate the mean squared displacement of the particles <Δr^{2}> from the measured g_{2}-1 values analytically. For example, for the backscattering geometry, an infinitely thick cell, large laser spot illumination and detection of photons coming from the center of the spot, the relationship between g_{2}-1 and <Δr^{2}> is:

$g_2(\tau)-1=\exp\left(-2 \gamma \sqrt{\langle\Delta r^2(\tau)\rangle k_0^2}\right)$, γ value is around 2.

For less thick cells and in transmission, the relationship depends also on l* (the transport length).

For quasi-transparent cells, an angle-independent variant method called cavity amplified scattering spectroscopy makes use of an integrating sphere to isotropically probe samples from all directions, elongating photon paths through the sample in the process, allowing for the study of low turbidity samples under the DWS formalism.

== Multispeckle diffusing-wave spectroscopy (MSDWS) ==
This technique either uses a camera to detect many speckle grains (see speckle pattern) or a ground glass to create a large number of speckle realizations (Echo-DWS). In both cases an average over a large number of statistically independent intensity values is obtained, allowing a much faster data acquisition time.

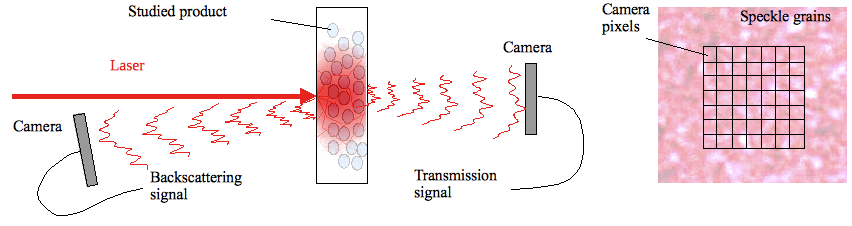
Typical setup of Multispeckle Diffusing-wave spectroscopy

$g_2(\tau)=\frac{\langle I(t)I(t+\tau)\rangle_p}{\langle I(t)\rangle_p^2}$

MSDWS is particularly adapted for the study of slow dynamics and non ergodic media. Echo-DWS allows seamless integration of MSDWS in a traditional DWS-scheme with superior temporal resolution down to 12 ns. Camera based adaptive image processing allows online measurement of particle dynamics for example during drying.
