= Dilatancy =

Dilatancy may refer to:

- Dilatancy (granular material): an increase in volume under shear
- Dilatancy (viscous material): the solidification of viscous fluids under pressure
