= Inertial number =

The Inertial number $I$ is a dimensionless quantity which quantifies the significance of dynamic effects on the flow of a granular material. It measures the ratio of inertial forces of grains to imposed forces: a small value corresponds to the quasi-static state, while a high value corresponds to the inertial state or even the "dynamic" state. It is given by:

$I = \frac{\dot\gamma d}{\sqrt{P/\rho}},$

where $\dot\gamma$ is the shear rate, $d$ the average particle diameter, $P$ is the pressure and $\rho$ is the density.

Generally three regimes are distinguished:

- $I<10^{-3}$: quasi static flow
- $10^{-3}<I<10^{-1}$: dense flow
- $I>10^{-1}$: collisional flow

One model of dense granular flows, the μ(I) rheology, asserts that the coefficient of friction μ of a granular material is a function of the inertial number only.
