= David A. Weitz =

Canadian American physicist

- Born: October 3, 1951 (age 75); Ottawa, Ontario, Canada
- Education: Harvard University; University of Waterloo
- Known for: Diffusing-wave spectroscopy; microrheology Contributions in the fields of confocal microscopy, soft lithography, microfabrication, microfluidics, nanotechnology, rheology, interface and colloid science, colloid chemistry, biophysics, soft condensed matter physics, phase transitions, complex fluids, the study of glass and amorphous solids, liquid crystals, self-assembly, fluid mechanics, surface-enhanced light scattering, diffusion-limited aggregation.
- Awards: Exxon Incentive Award
- Scientific career
- Fields: Physicist
- Workplaces: Harvard University
- Doctoral advisor: Michael Tinkham
- Doctoral students: Peter Lu

David A. Weitz (born October 3, 1951) is a Canadian/American physicist and Mallinckrodt Professor of Physics & Applied Physics at Harvard University. He is the former co-director of the BASF Advanced Research Initiative at Harvard, former co-director of the Harvard Kavli Institute for Bionano Science & Technology (2007-2010), and former director of the Harvard Materials Research Science & Engineering Center (2001-2020). He is known for his work in the areas of diffusing-wave spectroscopy, microrheology, microfluidics, rheology, fluid mechanics, interface and colloid science, colloid chemistry, biophysics, complex fluids, soft condensed matter physics, phase transitions, the study of glass and amorphous solids, liquid crystals, self-assembly, surface-enhanced light scattering, and diffusion-limited aggregation. His laboratory also developed Force spectrum microscopy, which is capable of measuring random intracellular forces. As of October 2024, he has a Hirsch index of 213.

Weitz received his B.Sc. in physics from the University of Waterloo and his PhD in superconductivity from Harvard. He then worked as a research physicist at Exxon Research and Engineering for nearly 18 years, leading the Interfaces and Inhomogeneous Materials Group and Complex Fluids Area. He then became a Professor of Physics at the University of Pennsylvania, before moving to Harvard in 1999.

In 2016, Weitz was elected a member of the National Academy of Engineering for "discoveries of complex fluids, colloids, and emulsions, which have resulted in new products and companies". Weitz is also an elected member of the National Academy of Science and the American Academy of Arts & Sciences.

Weitz is an active entrepreneur and the founder of many companies, including the microfluidics company RainDance and a desktop DNA sequencer, GnuBio, which was acquired by Biorad.

== See also ==
- List of University of Waterloo people
