= Μ(I) rheology =

Model of the rheology of a granular flow

In granular mechanics, the $\boldsymbol{\mu(I)}$ rheology is a rheological model for granular flows, describing the evolution of the macroscopic friction coefficient $\mu$ as a function of the dimensionless quantity $I$ called the Inertial number.

== Details ==
The complete $\mu(I)$ rheology model prescribes constitutive equations for the evolution of macroscopic friction coefficient $\mu$ as well as the granular (or particle) volume fraction $\phi$, as a functions of $I$. The inertial number $I$ is defined as

$I = \frac{||\dot\gamma|| d}{\sqrt{P/\rho}},$

where $\dot\gamma$ is the shear strain rate tensor, $||\dot\gamma||$ its magnitude, $d$ the typical particle diameter, $P$ the confining pressure and $\rho$ is the average material density of the particles. The square of the inertial number gives the ratio of the inertial stress scale to the confining pressure scale within the flow, $I^2 = \rho d^2 ||\dot\gamma||^2 / P$. Similar to other dimensionless numbers in fluid mechanics, $I$ can also be mapped locally within a granular flow, taking different values at different spatial locations.

The macroscopic friction coefficient in a granular flow is defined as the ratio of the shear stress to the normal stress $\mu = \tau / P$, analogous to the law of friction given by Coulomb. If one defines the confining normal stress as the isotropic part of the total stress tensor $\sigma_{ij}$ as, $P = -\text{Tr}(\sigma_{ij})/3$ (analogous to Pressure in fluid mechanics, $\mu(I)$ rheology gives a constitutive relationship between the stress tensor of the flow and the rate of strain tensor:

$\sigma_{ij} = -P\delta_{ij} + \mu(I)P \frac{\dot\gamma_{ij}}{||\dot\gamma||}$

where ${\dot\gamma_{ij}}/{||\dot\gamma||}$ gives the unit vector along the direction of the driving shear strain in the granular material. The above relation is no longer valid in the cases where normal stress differences develop.

$\mu$ thus indicates a measure of the anisotropy of the stress in a granular flow. The multiplicative term $\mu(I)P/||\dot\gamma||$ can be interpreted as the effective shear viscosity of the granular flow, while $P/||\dot\gamma||$ would be the analogous effective normal viscosity. If the granular material exhibits a yield stress, the shear viscosity tends to infinity in the limit of vanishing shear flow.

One deficiency of the $\mu(I)$ rheology is that it does not capture the hysteretic properties of a granular material.

== Development ==
The $\mu(I)$ rheology was developed by Pierre Jop et al. in 2006. Since its initial introduction, many works has been carried out to modify and improve this rheology model. This model provides a simple way to incorporate granular flow mechanics into continuum modelling, providing a computationally faster alternative to the particle-position based Discrete Element Method (DEM).

== See also ==
- Dilatancy (granular material)
