= Force chain =

Chain of transmission of stress forces in a granular media

In the study of the physics of granular materials, a force chain consists of a set of particles within a compressed granular material that are held together and jammed into place by a network of mutual compressive forces.

Between these chains are regions of low stress whose grains are shielded for the effects of the grains above by vaulting and arching. A set of interconnected force chains is known as a force network. Force networks visualise inter-particle forces, which is particularly informative for spherical particle systems. For non-spherical particle systems force chain networks benefit from being supplemented by traction chain networks. Traction chains visualise inter-particle tractions, which give additional insight in inter-particle contact not captured by force chains, in particular, the role of contact area over which inter-particle forces act.

Force networks are an emergent phenomenon that are created by the complex interaction of the individual grains of material and the patterns of pressure applied within the material. Force chains can be shown to have fractal properties.

Force chains have been investigated both experimentally, through the construction of specially instrumented physical models, and through computer simulation.
