= Rheology =

Study of the flow of matter, primarily in a fluid state

Rheology (/riˈɒlədʒi/; from Ancient Greek ῥέω (rhéō) 'flow' and -λoγία (-logía) 'study of') is the study of the flow of matter, primarily in a fluid (liquid or gas) state, as well as "soft solids", which experience conditions under which they respond with plastic flow rather than elastic deformation to forces applied to them. Rheology is the branch of physics that deals with the deformation and flow of materials, both solids and liquids. Microrheology is the specialization of rheology in the particle scale, whilst nanorheology is its specialization in the nanoscale.

The term rheology was coined by Eugene C. Bingham, a professor at Lafayette College, in 1920 from a suggestion by a colleague, Markus Reiner. The term was inspired by the aphorism of Heraclitus (often mistakenly attributed to Simplicius), panta rhei (πάντα ῥεῖ, 'everything flows') and was first used to describe the flow of liquids and the deformation of solids. It applies to substances that have a complex microstructure, such as muds, sludges, suspensions, and polymers and other glass formers (e.g., silicates), as well as many foods and additives, bodily fluids (e.g., blood) and other biological materials, and other materials that belong to the class of soft matter such as food.

Newtonian fluids can be characterized by a single coefficient of viscosity for a specific temperature. Although this viscosity will change with temperature, it does not change with the strain rate. Only a small group of fluids exhibit such constant viscosity. The large class of fluids whose viscosity changes with the strain rate (the relative flow velocity) are called non-Newtonian fluids.

== Key rheological models ==
Different materials exhibit diverse flow behaviors that can be described using various rheological models:

Bingham Plastic Model: Describes materials that behave as a rigid body at low stresses but flow as a viscous fluid once the yield stress is exceeded.

Herschel-Bulkley Model: Extends the Bingham model to include shear-thinning or shear-thickening behaviors, useful for modeling materials like toothpaste or blood.

Carreau-Yasuda Model: Describes shear-thinning behavior over a wide range of shear rates, often applied to polymer solutions and biological fluids.

Rheology generally accounts for the behavior of non-Newtonian fluids by characterizing the minimum number of functions that are needed to relate stresses with rate of change of strain or strain rates. For example, ketchup can have its viscosity reduced by shaking (or other forms of mechanical agitation, where the relative movement of different layers in the material actually causes the reduction in viscosity), but water cannot. Ketchup is a shear-thinning material, like yogurt and emulsion paint (US terminology latex paint or acrylic paint), exhibiting thixotropy, where an increase in relative flow velocity will cause a reduction in viscosity, for example, by stirring. Some other non-Newtonian materials show the opposite behavior, rheopecty (viscosity increasing with relative deformation), and are called shear-thickening or dilatant materials. Since Sir Isaac Newton originated the concept of viscosity, the study of liquids with strain-rate-dependent viscosity is also often called non-Newtonian fluid mechanics.

The experimental characterisation of a material's rheological behaviour is known as rheometry, although the term rheology is frequently used synonymously with rheometry, particularly by experimentalists. Theoretical aspects of rheology are the relation of the flow/deformation behaviour of material and its internal structure (e.g., the orientation and elongation of polymer molecules) and the flow/deformation behaviour of materials that cannot be described by classical fluid mechanics or elasticity.

== Scope ==
In practice, rheology is principally concerned with extending continuum mechanics to characterize the flow of materials that exhibit a combination of elastic, viscous and plastic behavior by properly combining elasticity and (Newtonian) fluid mechanics. It is also concerned with predicting mechanical behavior (on the continuum mechanical scale) based on the micro- or nanostructure of the material, e.g. the molecular size and architecture of polymers in solution or the particle size distribution in a solid suspension. Materials with the characteristics of a fluid will flow when subjected to a stress, which is defined as the force per area. There are different sorts of stress (e.g. shear, torsional, etc.), and materials can respond differently under different stresses. Much of theoretical rheology is concerned with associating external forces and torques with internal stresses, internal strain gradients, and flow velocities.

Continuum mechanics The study of the physics of continuous materials	Solid mechanics The study of the physics of continuous materials with a defined rest shape.	Elasticity; Describes materials that return to their rest shape after applied stresses are removed.	
Continuum mechanics The study of the physics of continuous materials	Solid mechanics The study of the physics of continuous materials with a defined rest shape.	Plasticity; Describes materials that permanently deform after a sufficient applied stress.	Rheology; The study of materials with both solid and fluid characteristics.
Continuum mechanics The study of the physics of continuous materials	Fluid mechanics The study of the physics of continuous materials which deform when subjected to a force.	Non-Newtonian fluid Do not undergo strain rates proportional to the applied shear stress.	Rheology; The study of materials with both solid and fluid characteristics.
Continuum mechanics The study of the physics of continuous materials	Fluid mechanics The study of the physics of continuous materials which deform when subjected to a force.	Newtonian fluids undergo strain rates proportional to the applied shear stress.	

Rheology unites the seemingly unrelated fields of plasticity and non-Newtonian fluid dynamics by recognizing that materials undergoing these types of deformation are unable to support a stress (particularly a shear stress, since it is easier to analyze shear deformation) in static equilibrium. In this sense, a solid undergoing plastic deformation is a fluid, although no viscosity coefficient is associated with this flow. Granular rheology refers to the continuum mechanical description of granular materials.

One of the major tasks of rheology is to establish by measurement the relationships between strains (or rates of strain) and stresses, although a number of theoretical developments (such as assuring frame invariants) are also required before using the empirical data. These experimental techniques are known as rheometry and are concerned with the determination of well-defined rheological material functions. Such relationships are then amenable to mathematical treatment by the established methods of continuum mechanics.

The characterization of flow or deformation originating from a simple shear stress field is called shear rheometry (or shear rheology). The study of extensional flows is called extensional rheology. Shear flows are much easier to study and thus much more experimental data are available for shear flows than for extensional flows.

== Viscoelasticity ==
- Fluid and solid character are relevant at long times:
  We consider the application of a constant stress (a so-called creep experiment):
  - if the material, after some deformation, eventually resists further deformation, it is considered a solid
  - if, by contrast, the material flows indefinitely, it is considered a fluid
- By contrast, elastic and viscous (or intermediate, viscoelastic) behaviour is relevant at short times (transient behaviour):
  We again consider the application of a constant stress:
  - if the material deformation strain increases linearly with increasing applied stress, then the material is linear elastic within the range it shows recoverable strains. Elasticity is essentially a time independent processes, as the strains appear the moment the stress is applied, without any time delay.
  - if the material deformation strain rate increases linearly with increasing applied stress, then the material is viscous in the Newtonian sense. These materials are characterized due to the time delay between the applied constant stress and the maximum strain.
  - if the materials behaves as a combination of viscous and elastic components, then the material is viscoelastic. Theoretically such materials can show both instantaneous deformation as elastic material and a delayed time dependent deformation as in fluids.
- Plasticity is the behavior observed after the material is subjected to a yield stress:
  A material that behaves as a solid under low applied stresses may start to flow above a certain level of stress, called the yield stress of the material. The term plastic solid is often used when this plasticity threshold is rather high, while yield stress fluid is used when the threshold stress is rather low. However, there is no fundamental difference between the two concepts.

== Dimensionless numbers ==
=== Deborah number ===
On one end of the spectrum we have an inviscid or a simple Newtonian fluid and on the other end, a rigid solid; thus the behavior of all materials fall somewhere in between these two ends. The difference in material behavior is characterized by the level and nature of elasticity present in the material when it deforms, which takes the material behavior to the non-Newtonian regime. The non-dimensional Deborah number is designed to account for the degree of non-Newtonian behavior in a flow. The Deborah number is defined as the ratio of the characteristic time of relaxation (which purely depends on the material and other conditions like the temperature) to the characteristic time of experiment or observation. Small Deborah numbers represent Newtonian flow, while non-Newtonian (with both viscous and elastic effects present) behavior occurs for intermediate range Deborah numbers, and high Deborah numbers indicate an elastic/rigid solid. Since Deborah number is a relative quantity, the numerator or the denominator can alter the number. A very small Deborah number can be obtained for a fluid with extremely small relaxation time or a very large experimental time, for example.

=== Reynolds number ===
In fluid mechanics, the Reynolds number is a measure of the ratio of inertial forces ($v_s\rho$) to viscous forces ($\frac{\mu}{L}$) and consequently it quantifies the relative importance of these two types of effect for given flow conditions. Under low Reynolds numbers viscous effects dominate and the flow is laminar, whereas at high Reynolds numbers inertia predominates and the flow may be turbulent. However, since rheology is concerned with fluids which do not have a fixed viscosity, but one which can vary with flow and time, calculation of the Reynolds number can be complicated.

It is one of the most important dimensionless numbers in fluid dynamics and is used, usually along with other dimensionless numbers, to provide a criterion for determining dynamic similitude. When two geometrically similar flow patterns, in perhaps different fluids with possibly different flow rates, have the same values for the relevant dimensionless numbers, they are said to be dynamically similar.

Typically it is given as follows:

$$\mathrm{Re} = \frac{\rho \frac{u_{s}^2}{L} }{ \mu \frac{u_{s}}{L^2}} = \frac{\rho u_{s} L}{ \mu} = \frac{u_{s} L}{ \nu}$$

where:

- u_{s} – mean flow velocity, [m s^{−1}]
- L – characteristic length, [m]
- μ – (absolute) dynamic fluid viscosity, [N s m^{−2}] or [Pa s]
- ν – kinematic fluid viscosity: $v = \frac{\mu}{\rho}$, [m^{2} s^{−1}]
- ρ – fluid density, [kg m^{−3}].

== Measurement ==
Rheometers are instruments used to characterize the rheological properties of materials, typically fluids that are melts or solution. These instruments impose a specific stress field or deformation to the fluid, and monitor the resultant deformation or stress. Instruments can be run in steady flow or oscillatory flow, in both shear and extension.

== Applications ==
Rheology has applications in materials science, engineering, geophysics, physiology, human biology and pharmaceutics. Materials science is utilized in the production of many industrially important substances, such as cement, paint, and chocolate, which have complex flow characteristics. In addition, plasticity theory has been similarly important for the design of metal forming processes. The science of rheology and the characterization of viscoelastic properties in the production and use of polymeric materials has been critical for the production of many products for use in both the industrial and military sectors. Study of flow properties of liquids is important for pharmacists working in the manufacture of several dosage forms, such as simple liquids, ointments, creams, pastes etc. The flow behavior of liquids under applied stress is of great relevance in the field of pharmacy. Flow properties are used as important quality control tools to maintain the superiority of the product and reduce batch to batch variations.

=== Materials science ===
==== Polymers ====
Examples may be given to illustrate the potential applications of these principles to practical problems in the processing and use of rubbers, plastics, and fibers. Polymers constitute the basic materials of the rubber and plastic industries and are of vital importance to the textile, petroleum, automobile, paper, and pharmaceutical industries. Their viscoelastic properties determine the mechanical performance of the final products of these industries, and also the success of processing methods at intermediate stages of production.

In viscoelastic materials, such as most polymers and plastics, the presence of liquid-like behaviour depends on the properties of and so varies with rate of applied load, i.e., how quickly a force is applied. The silicone toy 'Silly Putty' behaves quite differently depending on the time rate of applying a force. Pull on it slowly and it exhibits continuous flow, similar to that evidenced in a highly viscous liquid. Alternatively, when hit hard and directly, it shatters like a silicate glass.

In addition, conventional rubber undergoes a glass transition (often called a rubber-glass transition). E.g. The Space Shuttle Challenger disaster was caused by rubber O-rings that were being used well below their glass transition temperature on an unusually cold Florida morning, and thus could not flex adequately to form proper seals between sections of the two solid-fuel rocket boosters.

==== Biopolymers ====
Linear structure of cellulose — the most common component of all organic plant life on Earth. * Note the evidence of hydrogen bonding which increases the viscosity at any temperature and pressure. This is an effect similar to that of polymer crosslinking, but less pronounced.

==== Sol-gel ====
Polymerization process of tetraethylorthosilicate (TEOS) and water to form amorphous hydrated silica particles (Si-OH) can be monitored rheologically by a number of different methods.

With the viscosity of a sol adjusted into a proper range, both optical quality glass fiber and refractory ceramic fiber can be drawn which are used for fiber-optic sensors and thermal insulation, respectively. The mechanisms of hydrolysis and condensation, and the rheological factors that bias the structure toward linear or branched structures are the most critical issues of sol-gel science and technology.

=== Geophysics ===
The scientific discipline of geophysics includes study of the flow of molten lava and study of debris flows (fluid mudslides). This disciplinary branch also deals with solid Earth materials which only exhibit flow over extended time-scales. Those that display viscous behaviour are known as rheids. For example, granite can flow plastically with a negligible yield stress at room temperatures (i.e. a viscous flow). Long-term creep experiments (~10 years) indicate that the viscosity of granite and glass under ambient conditions are on the order of 10^{20} poises.

=== Physiology ===
Physiology includes the study of many bodily fluids that have complex structure and composition, and thus exhibit a wide range of viscoelastic flow characteristics. In particular there is a specialist study of blood flow called hemorheology. This is the study of flow properties of blood and its elements (plasma and formed elements, including red blood cells, white blood cells and platelets). Blood viscosity is determined by plasma viscosity, hematocrit (volume fraction of red blood cell, which constitute 99.9% of the cellular elements) and mechanical behaviour of red blood cells. Therefore, red blood cell mechanics is the major determinant of flow properties of blood.(The ocular Vitreous humor is subject to rheologic observations, particularly during studies of age-related vitreous liquefaction, or syneresis.)

The leading characteristic for hemorheology has been shear thinning in steady shear flow. Other non-Newtonian rheological characteristics that blood can demonstrate includes pseudoplasticity, viscoelasticity, and thixotropy.

==== Red blood cell aggregation ====
There are two current major hypotheses to explain blood flow predictions and shear thinning responses. The two models also attempt to demonstrate the drive for reversible red blood cell aggregation, although the mechanism is still being debated. There is a direct effect of red blood cell aggregation on blood viscosity and circulation. The foundation of hemorheology can also provide information for modeling of other biofluids. The bridging or "cross-bridging" hypothesis suggests that macromolecules physically crosslink adjacent red blood cells into rouleaux structures. This occurs through adsorption of macromolecules onto the red blood cell surfaces. The depletion layer hypothesis suggests the opposite mechanism. The surfaces of the red blood cells are bound together by an osmotic pressure gradient that is created by depletion layers overlapping. The effect of rouleaux aggregation tendency can be explained by hematocrit and fibrinogen concentration in whole blood rheology. Some techniques researchers use are optical trapping and microfluidics to measure cell interaction in vitro.

==== Disease and diagnostics ====
Changes to viscosity has been shown to be linked with diseases like hyperviscosity, hypertension, sickle cell anemia, and diabetes. Hemorheological measurements and genomic testing technologies act as preventative measures and diagnostic tools.

Hemorheology has also been correlated with aging effects, especially with impaired blood fluidity, and studies have shown that physical activity may improve the thickening of blood rheology.

=== Zoology ===
Many animals make use of rheological phenomena, for example sandfish that exploit the granular rheology of dry sand to "swim" in it or land gastropods that use snail slime for adhesive locomotion. Certain animals produce specialized endogenous complex fluids, such as the sticky slime produced by velvet worms to immobilize prey or the fast-gelling underwater slime secreted by hagfish to deter predators.

=== Food rheology ===
Food rheology is important in the manufacture and processing of food products, such as cheese and gelato. An adequate rheology is important for the indulgence of many common foods, particularly in the case of sauces, dressings, yogurt, or fondue.

Thickening agents, or thickeners, are substances which, when added to an aqueous mixture, increase its viscosity without substantially modifying its other properties, such as taste. They provide body, increase stability, and improve suspension of added ingredients. Thickening agents are often used as food additives and in cosmetics and personal hygiene products. Some thickening agents are gelling agents, forming a gel. The agents are materials used to thicken and stabilize liquid solutions, emulsions, and suspensions. They dissolve in the liquid phase as a colloid mixture that forms a weakly cohesive internal structure. Food thickeners frequently are based on either polysaccharides (starches, vegetable gums, and pectin), or proteins.

=== Concrete rheology ===
Concrete's and mortar's workability is related to the rheological properties of the fresh cement paste. The mechanical properties of hardened concrete increase if less water is used in the concrete mix design, however reducing the water-to-cement ratio may decrease the ease of mixing and application. To avoid these undesired effects, superplasticizers are typically added to decrease the apparent yield stress and the viscosity of the fresh paste. Their addition highly improves concrete and mortar properties.

=== Filled polymer rheology ===
The incorporation of various types of fillers into polymers is a common means of reducing cost and to impart certain desirable mechanical, thermal, electrical and magnetic properties to the resulting material. The advantages that filled polymer systems have to offer come with an increased complexity in the rheological behavior.

Usually when the use of fillers is considered, a compromise has to be made between the improved mechanical properties in the solid state on one side and the increased difficulty in melt processing, the problem of achieving uniform dispersion of the filler in the polymer matrix and the economics of the process due to the added step of compounding on the other. The rheological properties of filled polymers are determined not only by the type and amount of filler, but also by the shape, size and size distribution of its particles. The viscosity of filled systems generally increases with increasing filler fraction. This can be partially ameliorated via broad particle size distributions via the Farris effect. An additional factor is the stress transfer at the filler-polymer interface. The interfacial adhesion can be substantially enhanced via a coupling agent that adheres well to both the polymer and the filler particles. The type and amount of surface treatment on the filler are thus additional parameters affecting the rheological and material properties of filled polymeric systems.

It is important to take into consideration wall slip when performing the rheological characterization of highly filled materials, as there can be a large difference between the actual strain and the measured strain.

== Rheologist ==
A rheologist is an interdisciplinary scientist or engineer who studies the flow of complex liquids or the deformation of soft solids. It is not a primary degree subject; there is no qualification of rheologist as such. Most rheologists have a qualification in mathematics, the physical sciences (e.g. chemistry, physics, geology, biology), engineering (e.g. mechanical, chemical, materials science, plastics engineering and engineering or civil engineering), medicine, or certain technologies, notably materials or food. Typically, a small amount of rheology may be studied when obtaining a degree, but a person working in rheology will extend this knowledge during postgraduate research or by attending short courses and by joining a professional association.

== See also ==
- Bingham plastic
- Die swell
- Fluid dynamics
- Glass transition
- Interfacial rheology
- Liquid
- List of rheologists
- Microrheology
- Nordic Rheology Society
- Rheological weldability for thermoplastics
- Rheology–Raman spectroscopy
- Rheopectic
- Solid
- Transport phenomena
- μ(I) rheology: one model of the rheology of a granular flow.
