= Force spectrum microscopy =

Force Spectrum Microscopy (FSM) is an application of active microrheology developed to measure aggregate random forces in the cytoplasm. Large, inert flow tracers are injected into live cells and become lodged inside the cytoskeletal mesh, wherein it is oscillated by repercussions from active motor proteins. The magnitude of these random forces can be inferred from the frequency of oscillation of tracer particles. Tracking the fluctuations of tracer particles using optical microscopy can isolate the contribution of active random forces to intracellular molecular transport from that of Brownian motion.

== Basic principles ==
FSM was developed by Ming Guo and David A. Weitz to probe stochastic intracellular forces generated by motor proteins. Far from a liquid void, the cytoplasm contains a complex meshwork of actin and myosin conferring structural support to the cell, as well as harbouring vesicles and mitochondria among other organelles. Recent research on the macromolecular crowding inside the cytoplasm raises concerns whether diffusive-like motion of large molecules have been mistakenly attributed to Brownian forces. Instead, there are suspicions that myosin motor proteins, which tug randomly on the actin filaments embedded with large molecules, give rise to diffusive-like motion of molecules inside cells. Guo et al. developed an assay to distinguish whether particle motion inside cells are driven by thermal diffusion or by repercussions from active motor proteins like non-muscle myosin II shaking the cellular cytoskeleton.

FSM relies on injecting tracer particles coated with polyethylene glycol (PEG) larger than the cytoskeletal mesh size (>50 nm), settling in between an internetwork of actin filaments and myosin motor proteins. As myosin motor proteins tug on actin filaments to perform cellular work, these actin fluctuations invariably oscillate neighboring PEGylated particles. The magnitude of tracer fluctuation is proportional to the magnitude of aggregate active motor forces. Thus, by recording the displacement of tracer oscillations, FSM can gauge and derive the magnitude of forces exerted by active motor proteins.

== Force measurement ==
The fluctuations of PEGylated tracers coupled to aggregate myosin motor forces can be likened to a Hookean spring,

$$F = kx$$

where the force $F$ applied to generate the oscillation displacement $x$ is proportional to the effective spring constant $k$ of the intracellular environment. The displacement during oscillation is a spatial function of time, which can be directly measured using optical microscopy. A Fourier transform then maps information in the temporal domain to the frequency domain to derive a useful dimension as a function of frequency,

$$\langle \left( F(v)\right)^{2}\rangle =  \langle \left( K(v)\right)^{2}\rangle * \langle \left( x(v)\right)^{2}\rangle$$

where $\langle \left( F(v)\right)^{2}\rangle$, $\langle \left( K(v)\right)^{2}\rangle$ and $\langle \left( x(v)\right)^{2}\rangle$ are quadratic forms of averaged force, elasticity and displacement used to account for stochastic forces. Time-averaged Mean squared displacement, $MSD = \langle \left( X(t)\right)^{2}\rangle$ can be retrieved by a Fourier Transform from the frequency domain back to the temporal domain. In the context of oscillation frequency, the higher the force frequency spectrum, the greater the metabolic activity of the cell. Independent micromechanical measurements can calculate the elasticity of the cytoplasm. By using an optical tweezer to apply a prescribed force to a tracer particle, FSM can measure the resulting displacement in order to estimate the elastic spring constant.

== Applications ==
=== Cytoplasmic fluidity ===
Directed oscillation of tracer particles using optical tweezers resulted in displacement that was nearly synchronized with applied force, suggesting that the cytoplasm is materially closer to an elastic solid. This is in stark contrast to previous hypothesis that the cytoplasm is a viscoelastic fluid in which large molecules can freely diffuse. In ATP-depleted cells, in which non-muscle myosin II are inactivated, FSM experiments reveal that tracer particles cease to oscillate as if the cytoplasm had solidified. Myosin IIs are motor proteins that bind and tugs on actin filaments through ATP hydrolysis. This further corroborates the finding that in nutrient-starved bacteria, the cytoplasm transitions into a glasslike substance. Thus, ATP-hydrolysis by motor proteins appear to be critical to sustain cytoplasmic fluidity, which is crucial to vesicle transport and diffusive motion in the cytoskeleton.

=== Differential diagnosis of malignant cancer ===
By measuring the general state of activity inside a cell, FSM can be applied to identify malignant cancerous cells, which are characteristically more elastic and more motile. FSM measurements on malignant MCF-7 breast cancer cells and benign MCF-10A breast cancer cells revealed a statistically significant separation in force spectrum that allows FSM to assay for metastatic cancer. Dimensionality of extracellular environment greatly influences FSM measurements of cancerous cells. In a 3D matrix, MDA-MB-231 metastatic breast cancer cells had comparatively more solid cytoplasm than counterparts cultured on 2D plates.
