= Rotational correlation time =

Measure of rotation of a molecule

Rotational correlation time ($\tau_c$) is the average time it takes for a molecule to rotate one radian.

In solution, rotational correlation times are in the order of picoseconds. For example, the $\tau_c =$ 1.7 ps for water, and 100 ps for a pyrroline nitroxyl radical in a DMSO-water mixture. Rotational correlation times are employed in the measurement of microviscosity (viscosity at the molecular level) and in protein characterization.

Rotational correlation times may be measured by rotational (microwave), dielectric, and nuclear magnetic resonance (NMR) spectroscopy. Rotational correlation times of probe molecules in media have been measured by fluorescence lifetime or for radicals, from the linewidths of electron spin resonances.
