= Frank Stillinger =

American chemist

Frank H. Stillinger (born August 15, 1934) is an American theoretical chemist and a namesake of the Lubachevsky–Stillinger algorithm. He has recently collaborated with research groups as a senior scientist at Princeton University.

Stillinger graduated from the University of Rochester in 1955; he earned a Ph.D. in theoretical chemistry from Yale in 1958. In September 1959 he joined the Research Area of Bell Labs in Murray Hill, NJ. Following the U.S. Justice Department's divestiture order for Bell Labs, Stillinger transferred to Lucent Technologies in 1996 and later to Lucent's spinoff, Agere Systems, where he worked until 2001. Since late 1996 Stillinger has been a Visiting Senior Scientist at Princeton University.

Stillinger's research career has concentrated on condensed matter phenomena, both thermodynamic and kinetic. This research has included creation and computer simulation of molecular interaction potentials for water, silicon, and spontaneous-chiral-symmetry-breaking substances. These and other productive research topics have generated over 400 reviewed publications, involving more than 130 coauthors.

== Awards and honors ==
- Elliott Cresson Medal, Franklin Institute (1978)
- Elected Member, National Academy of Sciences (1984)
- Joel Hildebrand Prize, American Chemical Society (1986)
- Irving Langmuir Award, American Physical Society (1989)
- Peter Debye Award, American Chemical Society (1992)
- Onsager Medal, Norwegian University of Science and Technology, Trondheim (2002)
- Theoretical Chemistry Award, American Chemical Society (2013)

== Selected publications ==
- F. H. Stillinger, Energy Landscapes, Inherent Structures, and Condensed-Matter Phenomena. Princeton (2016).
