= Nordic Rheology Society =

Professional organisation

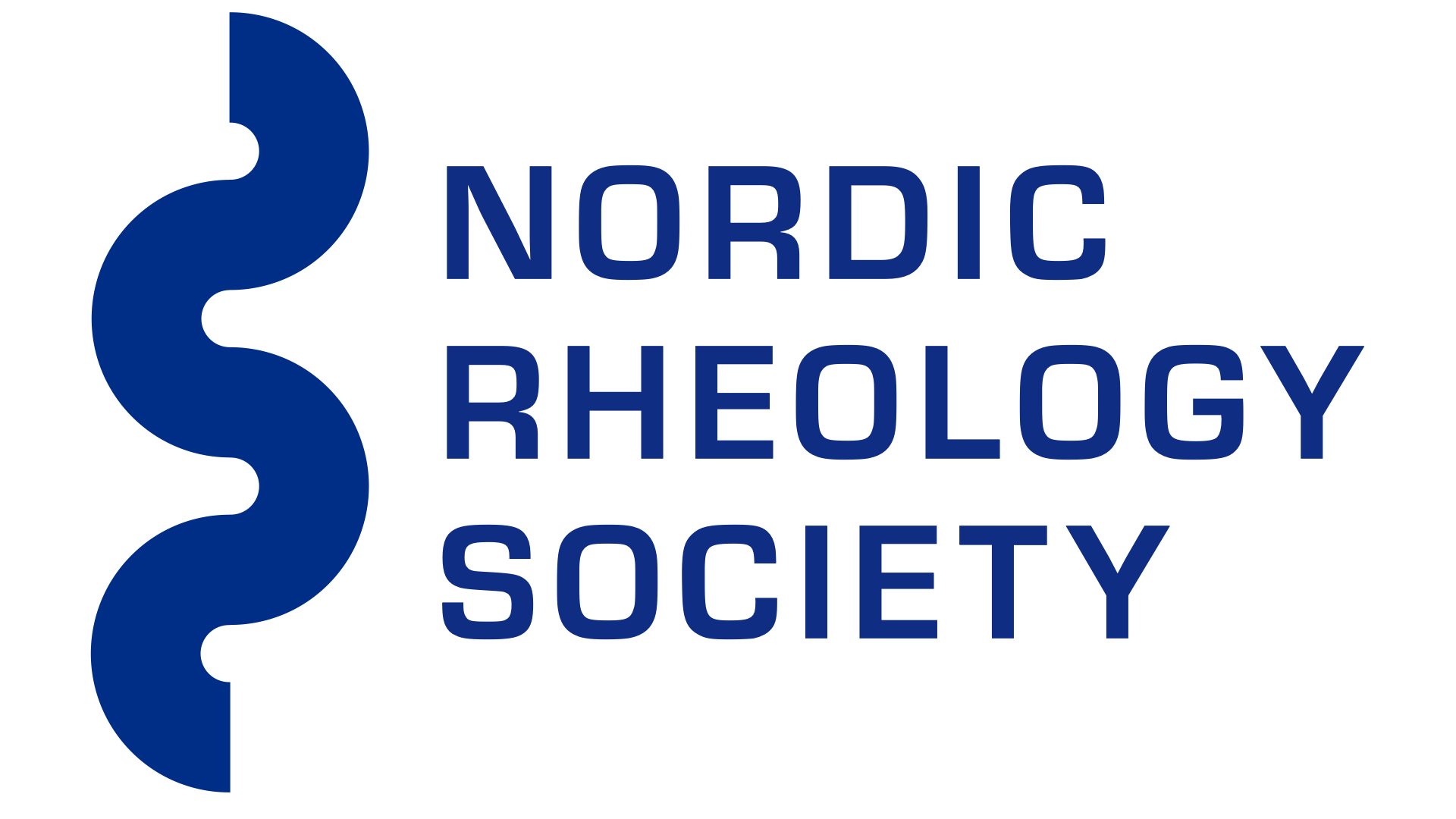
- Founded: 1992
- Type: Professional association
- Purpose: To promote and propagate rheology at all levels throughout the Nordic countries.
- Location: Nordic countries
- Official language: English
- President: Olli-Ville Laukkanen
- Website: nordicrheologysociety.org

The Nordic Rheology Society (NRS) is a professional organization that promotes and propagates rheology in the Nordic countries and beyond. The NRS provides a forum for academic and industrial researchers to discuss their ideas and to present their research.

== History ==
The predecessor of the NRS, Swedish Society of Rheology, was founded in 1956 as a part of the Swedish National Committee for Mechanics. Erik Forslind was elected as the first president, Hilding Faxén as vice-president and Josef Kubát as secretary. The Swedish Society of Rheology became a full member of the International Committee on Rheology (ICR) in 1969, and it organized the VII^{th} International Congress on Rheology in Gothenburg in 1976.

The name Swedish Society of Rheology was changed to Nordic Rheology Society in 1992 with the aim of increased Nordic cooperation. The first president of the NRS was Carl Klason. Since 1992, the NRS has annually organized the Nordic Rheology Conference. In addition, the NRS has hosted the Annual European Rheology Conference (AERC) in 2010 (Gothenburg), 2017 (Copenhagen) and 2021 (online). During the COVID-19 pandemic, the NRS pioneered the use of avatar-based virtual event platforms in scientific conferences.

== Conferences and publications ==
The annual scientific meeting of the NRS, Nordic Rheology Conference (NRC), circulates between the Nordic countries. It typically features scientific presentations from various fields of rheology, a technical exhibition, a rheology short course, as well as social program. The Annual Transactions of the Nordic Rheology Society is the official publication of the NRS and it features papers presented at NRCs.

Furthermore, the NRS occasionally organizes local rheology seminars in the Nordic countries.

== Awards ==
The NRS presents two awards for outstanding rheologists who are active in the Nordic countries:

- The Carl Klason Rheology Award
- The Young Rheologists Rheology Award
