= Rheology–Raman spectroscopy =

Rheology-Raman Spectroscopy

Rheology–Raman spectroscopy, is an analytical technique used to simultaneously measure the stress–strain response of fluids, semisolids, and solids, as well as the energy shifts of the sample molecular bonds. RheoRaman is useful for simultaneously measuring chemical structure and mechanical properties, which allows for comparison of molecular changes with rheological behavior in real time.

== Description ==
RheoRaman works by sending a laser beam through a sequence of optical and mechanical components so that chemical and mechanical information can be collected from the same sample at the same moment. The process begins at the laser source, which generates the monochromatic light needed for Raman scattering. This beam is redirected by a mirror toward the objective lens. It then passes through the objective lens, which focuses the laser onto the sample while also serving as the collection optic for the scattered Raman signal. The focused laser beam enters the RheoRaman coupling module, the interface that aligns the Raman optics with the rheometer's sample gap. Once the light reaches the sample, the system simultaneously performs two measurements: the rheometer applies controlled deformation through the rheometer rotor, and the resulting mechanical response is captured by the torque sensor, while the Raman shifted light produced by molecular vibrations is collected and sent to the Raman spectrometer. Both the mechanical data stream and the Raman spectral data feed into the computer, where they are synchronized in time.

Commercial and research descriptions of RheoRaman implementations emphasize the same sequence of optics and the optically transparent rheometer base or coupling module that permits Raman collection from the rheometer sample gap while the rheometer imposes controlled shear or oscillation; these sources also document applications such as monitoring crystallization, curing, gelation, and other structure–property transitions where simultaneous spectroscopic and mechanical data are advantageous.

Reviews and application notes describe how simultaneous Raman and rheology measurements reveal molecular‑level changes (for example, changes in vibrational band positions or intensities) that correlate with macroscopic rheological metrics (such as viscosity, storage modulus 𝐺′, and loss modulus 𝐺′′), and they summarize laboratory and industrial studies that have used RheoRaman to study polymer melting/crystallization, curing reactions, and phase transitions in complex fluids.

Conference and laboratory reports further document simultaneous RheoRaman setups used for reaction monitoring and stress/strain calibration, demonstrating that Raman spectral shifts can be recorded under applied mechanical deformation and synchronized with rheometric outputs for quantitative correlation of molecular and mechanical changes.
