= Complex fluid =

Complex fluids are mixtures that have a coexistence between two phases: solid–liquid (suspensions or solutions of macromolecules such as polymers), solid–gas (granular), liquid–gas (foams) or liquid–liquid (emulsions). They exhibit unusual mechanical responses to applied stress or strain due to the geometrical constraints that the phase coexistence imposes. The mechanical response includes transitions between solid-like and fluid-like behavior as well as fluctuations. Their mechanical properties can be attributed to characteristics such as high disorder, caging, and clustering on multiple length scales.

== Example ==
Shaving cream is an example of a complex fluid. Without stress, the foam appears to be a solid: it does not flow and can support (very) light loads. However, when adequate stress is applied, shaving cream flows easily like a fluid. On the level of individual bubbles, the flow is due to rearrangements of small collections of bubbles. On this scale, the flow is not smooth, but instead consists of fluctuations due to rearrangements of the bubbles and releases of stress. These fluctuations are similar to the fluctuations that are studied in earthquakes.

== Dynamics ==
The dynamics of the particles in complex fluids are an area of current research. Energy lost due to friction may be a nonlinear function of the velocity and normal forces. The topological inhibition to flow by the crowding of constituent particles is a key element in these systems. Under certain conditions, including high densities and low temperatures, when externally driven to induce flow, complex fluids are characterized by irregular intervals of solid-like behavior followed by stress relaxations due to particle rearrangements. The dynamics of these systems are highly nonlinear in nature. The increase in stress by an infinitesimal amount or a small displacement of a single particle can result in the difference between an arrested state and fluid-like behavior.

Although many materials found in nature can fit into the class of complex fluids, very little is well understood about them; inconsistent and controversial conclusions concerning their material properties still persist. The careful study of these systems may lead to "new physics" and new states of matter. For example, it has been suggested that these systems can jam and a "jamming phase diagram" can be used to consider how these systems can jam and unjam. It is not known whether further research will demonstrate these findings, or whether such a theoretical framework will prove useful. As yet this large body of theoretical work has been poorly supported with experiments.
