= Farris effect (rheology) =

In rheology, the Farris Effect describes the decrease of the viscosity of a suspension upon increasing the dispersity of the solid additive, at constant volume fraction of the solid additive. That is, that a broader particle size distribution yields a lower viscosity than a narrow particle size distribution, for the same concentration of particles. The phenomenon is names after Richard J. Farris, who modeled the effect. The effect is relevant whenever suspensions are flowing, particularly for suspensions with high loading fractions. Examples include hydraulic fracturing fluids, metal injection molding feedstocks, cosmetics, and various geological processes including sedimentation and lava flows.
