= Fragile matter =

In materials science, fragile matter is a granular material that is jammed solid. Everyday examples include beans getting stuck in a hopper in a whole food shop, or milk powder getting jammed in an upside-down bottle. The term was coined by physicist Michael Cates, who asserts that such circumstances warrant a new class of materials. The jamming thus described can be unjammed by mechanical means, such as tapping or shaking the container, or poking it with a stick.

Cates proposed that such jammed systems differ from ordinary solids in that if the direction of the applied stress changes, the jam will break up. Sometimes the change of direction required is very small.

Perhaps the simplest example is a pile of sand, which is solid in the sense that the pile sustains its shape despite the force of gravity. Slight tilting or vibration is enough to enable the grains to shift, collapsing the pile.

Not all jammed systems are fragile, i.e. foam. Shaving foam is jammed because the bubbles are tightly packed together under the isotropic stress imposed by atmospheric pressure. If it were a fragile solid, it would respond plastically to shear stress, however small. But because bubbles deform, foam actually responds elastically provided that the stress is below a threshold value. Fragile matter is also not to be confused with cases in which the particles have adhered to one another ("caking").
