= Cohesion (chemistry) =

Property of substances whose particles stick together

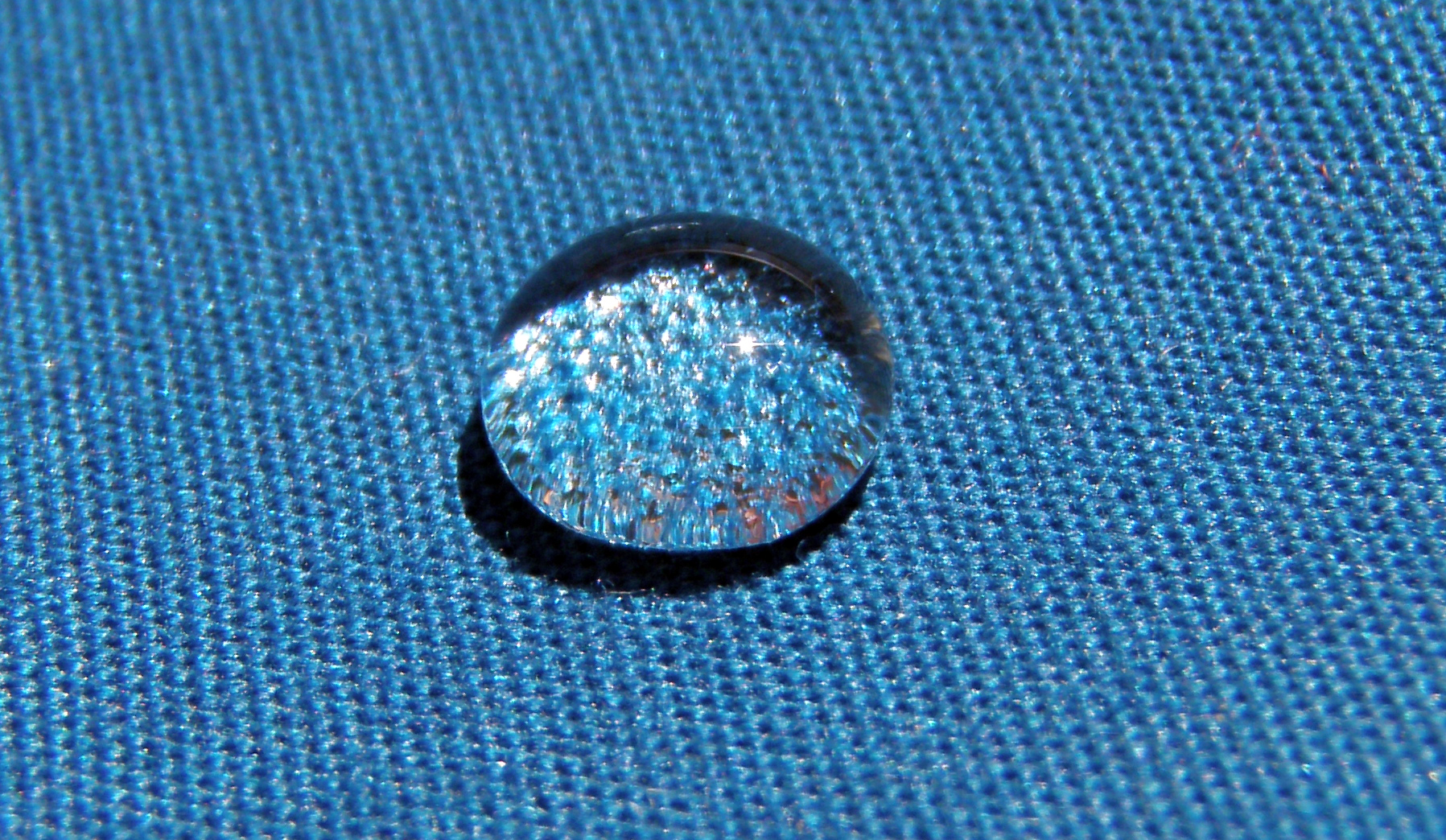
Water drop in equilibrium of cohesion and gravity

In chemistry and physics, cohesion (from Latin cohaesiō 'cohesion, unity'), also called cohesive attraction or cohesive force, is the action or property of like molecules sticking together, being mutually attractive. It is an intrinsic property of a substance that is caused by the shape and structure of its molecules, which makes the distribution of surrounding electrons irregular when molecules get close to one another, creating an electrical attraction that can maintain a macroscopic structure such as a water drop. Cohesion allows for surface tension, creating a "solid-like" state upon which light-weight or low-density materials can be placed.

Water, for example, is strongly cohesive as each molecule may make four hydrogen bonds to other water molecules in a tetrahedral configuration. This results in a relatively strong Coulomb force between molecules. In simple terms, the polarity (a state in which a molecule is oppositely charged on its poles) of water molecules allows them to be attracted to each other. The polarity is due to the electronegativity of the atom of oxygen: oxygen is more electronegative than the atoms of hydrogen, so the electrons they share through the covalent bonds are more often close to oxygen rather than hydrogen. These are called polar covalent bonds, covalent bonds between atoms that thus become oppositely charged. In the case of a water molecule, the hydrogen atoms carry positive charges while the oxygen atom has a negative charge. This charge polarization within the molecule allows it to align with adjacent molecules through strong intermolecular hydrogen bonding, rendering the bulk liquid cohesive. Van der Waals gases such as methane, however, have weak cohesion due only to van der Waals forces that operate by induced polarity in non-polar molecules.

Cohesion, along with adhesion (attraction between unlike molecules), helps explain phenomena such as meniscus, surface tension, and capillary action.

Mercury in a glass flask is a good example of the effects of the ratio between cohesive and adhesive forces. Because of its high cohesion and low adhesion to the glass, mercury does not spread out to cover the bottom of the flask, and if enough is placed in the flask to cover the bottom, it exhibits a strongly convex meniscus, whereas the meniscus of water is concave. Mercury will not wet the glass, unlike water and many other liquids, and if the glass is tipped, it will 'roll' around inside.

== See also ==
- Adhesion – the attraction of molecules or compounds for other molecules of a different kind
- Specific heat capacity – the amount of heat needed to raise the temperature of one gram of a substance by one degree Celsius
- Heat of vaporization – the amount of energy needed to change one gram of a liquid substance to a gas at constant temperature
- Zwitterion – a molecule composed of individual functional groups which are ions, of which the most prominent examples are the amino acids
- Chemical polarity – a neutral, or uncharged molecule or its chemical groups having an electric dipole moment, with a negatively charged end and a positively charged end
