= Jamming (physics) =

Physical process

Jamming during discharge of granular material is due to arch formation (red spheres)

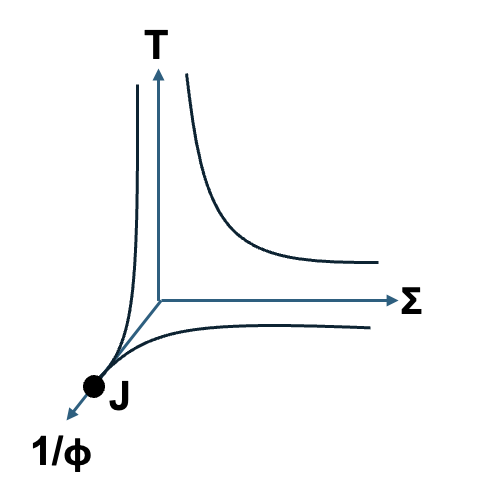
The second-order jamming phase diagram as introduced by O'Hern et al. (2003), expanding on Liu and Nagel (1998) where φ is packing fraction, T is temperature, and Σ is shear stress.

Jamming is the physical process by which the viscosity of some mesoscopic materials, such as granular materials, glasses, foams, polymers, emulsions, and other complex fluids, increases with increasing particle density. The jamming transition has been proposed as a new type of phase transition, a strongly idealized hard-sphere glass transition, but very different from the formation of crystalline solids.

While a glass transition occurs when the liquid state is cooled, the jamming transition happens when the density, or the packing fraction of the particles, is increased. This crowding of the constituent particles prevents them from flowing under an applied stress and from exploring phase space, thus making the aggregate material behave as a solid. The system may be able to unjam if volume fraction is decreased, or external stresses are applied such that they exceed the yield stress. This transition is interesting because it is nonlinear with respect to volume fraction.

The jamming phase diagram relates the jamming transition to inverse density, stress and temperature.

The density at which systems jam is determined by many factors, including the shape of their components, the deformability of the particles, frictional interparticle forces, and the degree of dispersity of the system. The overall shape of the jamming manifold may depend on the particular system. For example, a particularly interesting feature of the jamming transition is the difference between attractive and repulsive particle systems. Whether the jamming surface diverges for high enough densities or low temperatures is uncertain.

Simulations of jammed systems study particle configurations leading to jamming in both static systems and systems under shear. Under shear stress, the average cluster size may diverge after a finite amount of strain, leading to a jammed state. A particle configuration may exist in a jammed state with a stress required to "break" the force chains causing the jam.

The simplest realization of a static jammed system is a random sphere packing of frictionless soft spheres that are jammed together upon applying an external hydrostatic pressure to the packing. Right at the jamming transition, the applied pressure is zero and the shear modulus is also zero, which coincides with the loss of rigidity and the unjamming of the system. Also, at the jamming point the system is isostatic. Above the jamming point, the applied pressure causes an increase of volume fraction by squeezing the soft spheres closer together, and thus creates additional contacts between neighboring spheres. This leads to an increase of the average number of contacts $z$. As shown in numerical simulations by Corey O'Hern and collaborators, the shear modulus G increases with increasing $z$ following the law: $G \sim (z-2d)$, where d is the dimension of space. A first-principles microscopic theory of elasticity developed by Alessio Zaccone and E. Scossa-Romano quantitatively explains this law in terms of two contributions: the first term is a bonding-type contribution, thus proportional to $z$, and related to particle displacements which exactly follow the applied shear deformation; the second (negative) term is due to internal relaxations needed to keep local mechanical equilibrium in a strained disordered environment, and thus proportional to the total number of degrees of freedom, hence the dependence on space dimension d. This model is relevant for compressed emulsions, where the friction between particles is negligible. Another example of static jammed system is a sand pile, which is jammed under the force of gravity and no energy is being dissipated.

A high dimensional limit mean-field theory for jamming was obtained by Giorgio Parisi and Francesco Zamponi, where clustering density and jamming density $\phi$ scales as:
$$\phi \sim \frac{d \log(d)}{2^d}$$
Near jamming from below$\left(\phi \to \phi_J^- \right)$, the pair correlation function delta peak scales as:

$g(r) \sim \frac{1}{\delta}f \left( \frac{r-1}{\delta}\right)\text{, where } \delta \equiv\phi_J - \phi \to 0$

However, the square-root singularity of $g(r)$ as seen from simulations was not present. The full solution, including critical scaling, was shown by Charbonneau et al. in 2014.

Systems which are consuming energy are also sometimes described as being jammed. An example is traffic jams, where due to jamming the average velocity of cars on a road may drop sharply. Here the cars on a road may be thought of like a granular material or a non-Newtonian fluid that is being pumped through a tube. There under certain conditions the effective viscosity may rapidly increase, dramatically increasing the granular material or fluids's resistance to flowing and so causing the velocity to drop or even come to a complete stop. In this analogy the cars are like the grains in a granular material and if they are dense enough (i.e., closely enough spaced along the road) then interactions between the cars (as they must avoid each other to avoid crashing) cause jamming. A simple model of this behavior is the Nagel-Schreckenberg model.

The notion of jamming can also be considered from a biophysical perspective to characterize the arrest of cellular motion. Cell motility is of importance in many biological processes including tissue morphogenesis, wound healing, and cancer invasion. Characterizing the mechanisms that result in these "jamming" and "unjamming" phenomena can yield a more nuanced view of tissue development and aid in identifying new targets for disease therapies. Identifying properties defining these cellular phase changes has been a topic of recent interest. Cell density-based jamming is analogous to particle jamming in physical science, as the viscosity of a group of cells, like a group of particles, will increase as cell density increases. Other key parameters uniquely discussed for cell jamming include cell shape, cell-cell contact, and cell motion, studied in both embryonic organization and asthma. These factors are closely related to each other. In one attempt to illustrate the mechanisms of cell jamming, Lawson-Keister et al. use three factors: a) density, b) geometric incompatibility, and c) fluctuations. Efforts of experimentally quantifying cellular viscoelastic phases include in-vivo injection of force-sensing ferrofluid, micropipette aspiration, and 3D digital image correlation of cellular displacement.

In recent years, jamming as a limiting case of the glassy transition, once an active area of research, has seen a petering of interest.
