= Suspension (chemistry) =

Heterogeneous mixture of solid particles dispersed in a medium

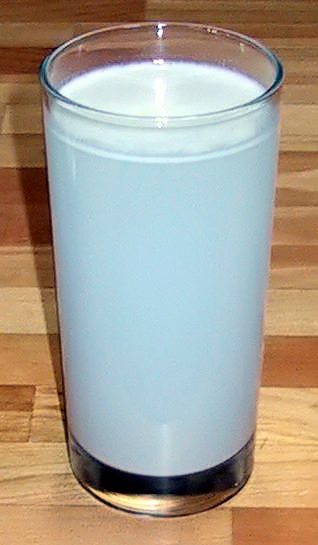
A suspension of flour mixed in a glass of water, showing the Tyndall effect

In chemistry, a suspension is a heterogeneous mixture of a fluid that contains solid particles sufficiently large for sedimentation. The particles may be visible to the naked eye, usually must be larger than one micrometer, and will eventually settle, although the mixture is only classified as a suspension when and while the particles have not settled out.

== Properties ==
A suspension is a heterogeneous mixture in which the solid particles do not dissolve, but get suspended throughout the bulk of the solvent, left floating around freely in the medium. The internal phase (solid) is dispersed throughout the external phase, fluid, through mechanical (action), with the use of certain or suspending agents.

An example of a suspension would be sand in water. The suspended particles are visible under a microscope and will settle over time if left undisturbed. This distinguishes a suspension from a colloid, in which the colloid particles are smaller and do not settle. Colloids and suspensions are different from solution, in which the dissolved substance (solute) does not exist as a solid, and solvent and solute are homogeneously mixed.

A suspension of liquid droplets or fine solid particles in a gas is called an aerosol. In the atmosphere, the suspended particles are called particulates and consist of fine dust and soot particles, sea salt, biogenic and volcano sulfates, nitrate, and cloud droplets.

Suspensions are classified on the basis of the dispersed phase and the dispersion medium, where the former is essentially solid while the latter may either be a solid, a liquid, or a gas.

In modern chemical process industries, high-shear mixing technology has been used to create many novel suspensions.

Suspensions are unstable from a thermodynamic point of view but can be kinetically stable over a longer period of time, which in turn can determine a suspension's shelf life. This time span needs to be measured in order to provide accurate information to the consumer and ensure the best product quality.

"Dispersion stability refers to the ability of a dispersion to resist change in its properties over time."

IUPAC definition

Dispersion of solid particles in a liquid.

Note: Definition based on that in ref.

== Technique monitoring physical stability ==
Multiple light scattering coupled with vertical scanning is the most widely used technique to monitor the dispersion state of a product, hence identifying and quantifying destabilization phenomena. It works on concentrated dispersions without dilution. When light is sent through the sample, it is back scattered by the particles. The backscattering intensity is directly proportional to the size and volume fraction of the dispersed phase. Therefore, local changes in concentration (sedimentation) and global changes in size (flocculation, aggregation) are detected and monitored. Of primary importance in the analysis of stability in particle suspensions is the value of the zeta potential exhibited by suspended solids. This parameter indicates the magnitude of interparticle electrostatic repulsion and is commonly analyzed to determine how the use of adsorbates and pH modification affect particle repulsion and suspension stabilization or destabilization.

== Accelerating methods for shelf life prediction ==
The kinetic process of destabilisation can be rather long (up to several months or even years for some products) and it is often required for the formulator to use further accelerating methods in order to reach reasonable development time for new product design. Thermal methods are the most commonly used and consists in increasing temperature to accelerate destabilisation (below critical temperatures of phase and degradation). Temperature affects not only the viscosity, but also interfacial tension in the case of non-ionic surfactants or more generally interactions forces inside the system. Storing a dispersion at high temperatures enables simulation of real life conditions for a product (e.g. tube of sunscreen cream in a car in the summer), but also to accelerate destabilisation processes up to 200 times including vibration, centrifugation and agitation are sometimes used. They subject the product to different forces that pushes the particles / film drainage. However, some emulsions would never coalesce in normal gravity, while they do under artificial gravity. Moreover, segregation of different populations of particles have been highlighted when using centrifugation and vibration.

== Examples ==
Common examples of suspensions include:

- Mud or muddy water: where soil, clay, or silt particles are suspended in water
- Flour suspended in water
- Chalk suspended in water
- Sand suspended in water
- Oil incorporated in water
- Pulp suspended in lemonade
- Blood suspended in plasma

== See also ==
- Emulsion – Mixture of two or more immiscible liquids
- Farris effect (rheology)
- Froth flotation – Process for selectively separating of hydrophobic materials from hydrophilic
- Sediment transport – Movement of solid particles, typically by gravity and fluid entrainment
- Settleable solids – Process by which particulates move towards the bottom of a liquid and form a sediment
- Sol – Colloidal suspension of very small solid particles in a continuous liquid medium
- Turbidity – Cloudiness of a fluid
- Tyndall effect – Scattering of light by tiny particles in a colloidal suspension
- Zeta potential – Electrokinetic potential in colloidal dispersions
