= Egg timer =

Timing device used in cooking

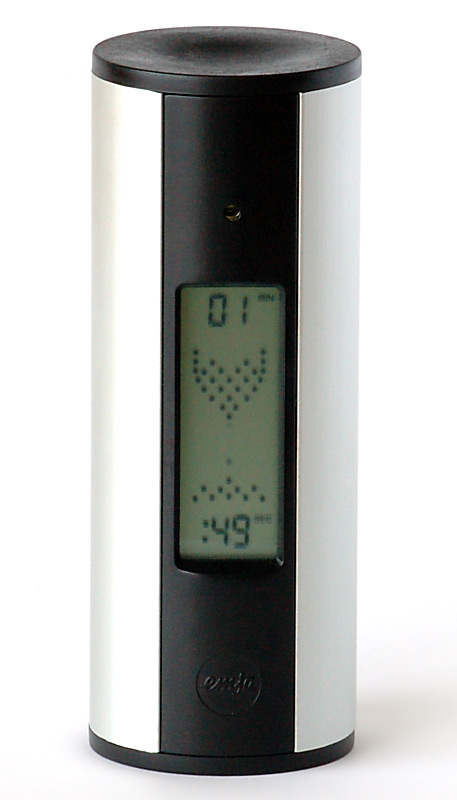
Digital egg timer with animated falling sand

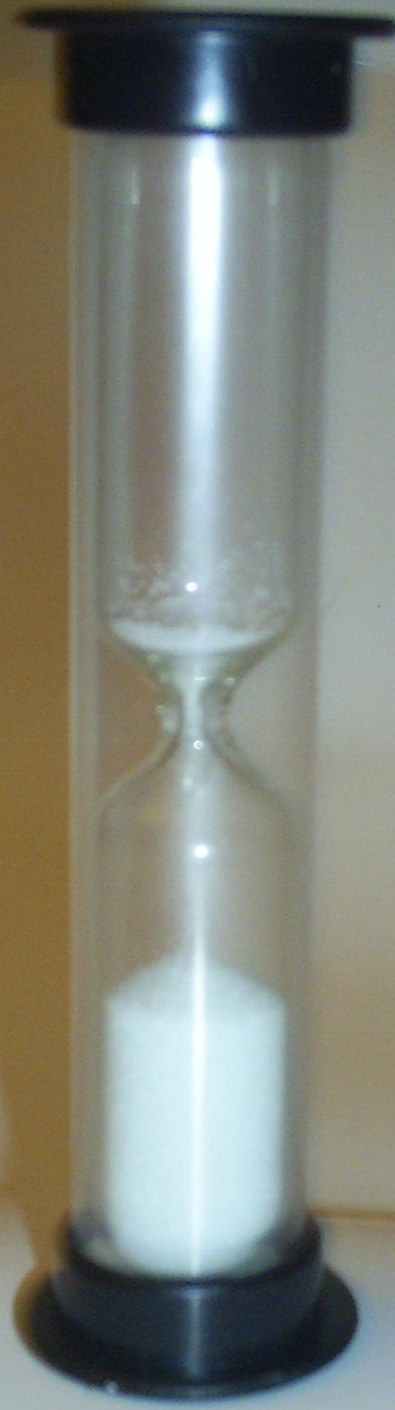
Egg timer of the traditional hourglass type

An egg timer or kitchen timer is a device whose primary function is to assist in timing during cooking; the name comes from the first timers initially being used for the timing of cooking eggs. Early designs simply counted down for a specific period of time. Some modern designs can time more accurately by depending on water temperature rather than an absolute time.

== Technology ==
Traditionally egg timers were small hourglasses. As technology progressed mechanical countdown timers were developed which had an adjustable dial and could be applied to a wide range of timed cooking tasks. Most recently digital timers have also been manufactured and a wide selection of software is available to perform this task on a computer or mobile phone. The task is simple to perform on most microwaves and oven timers.

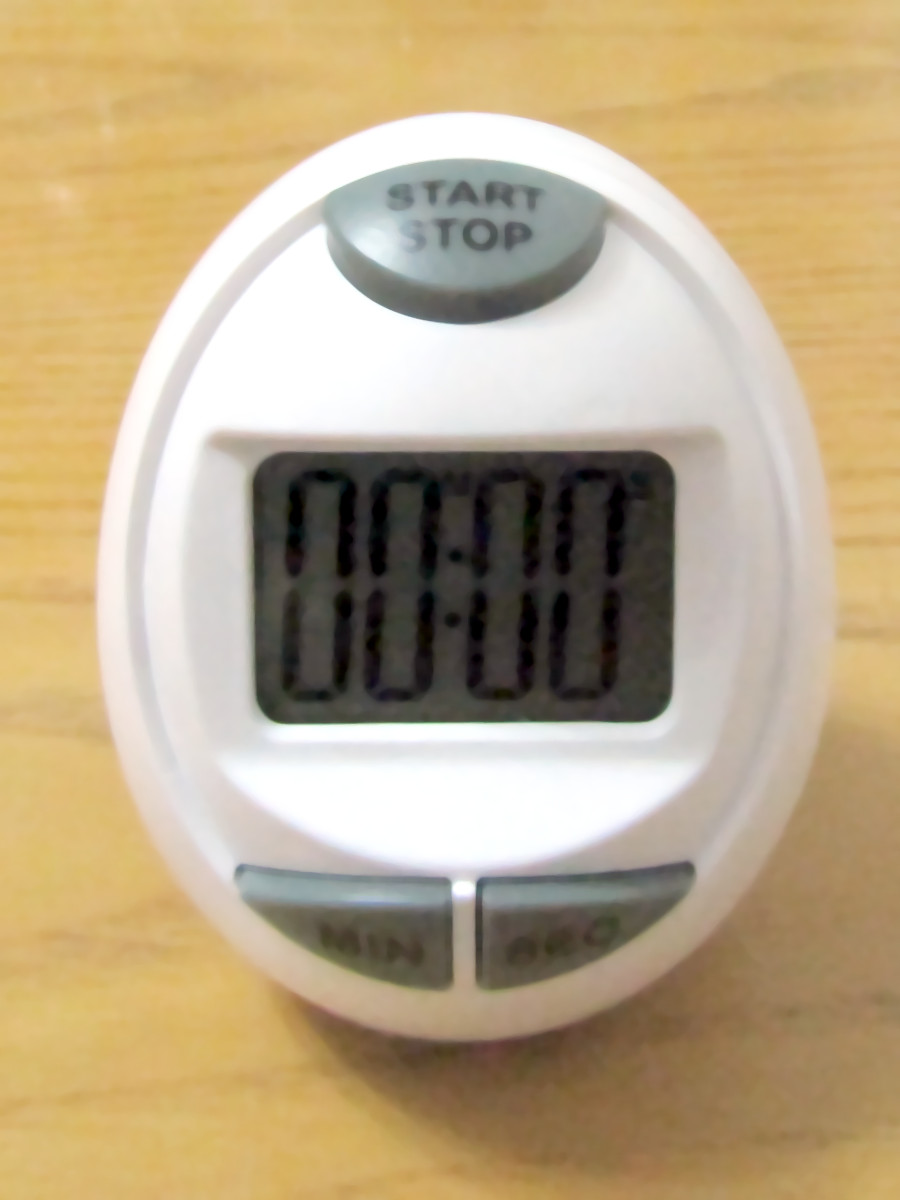
Digital egg timer

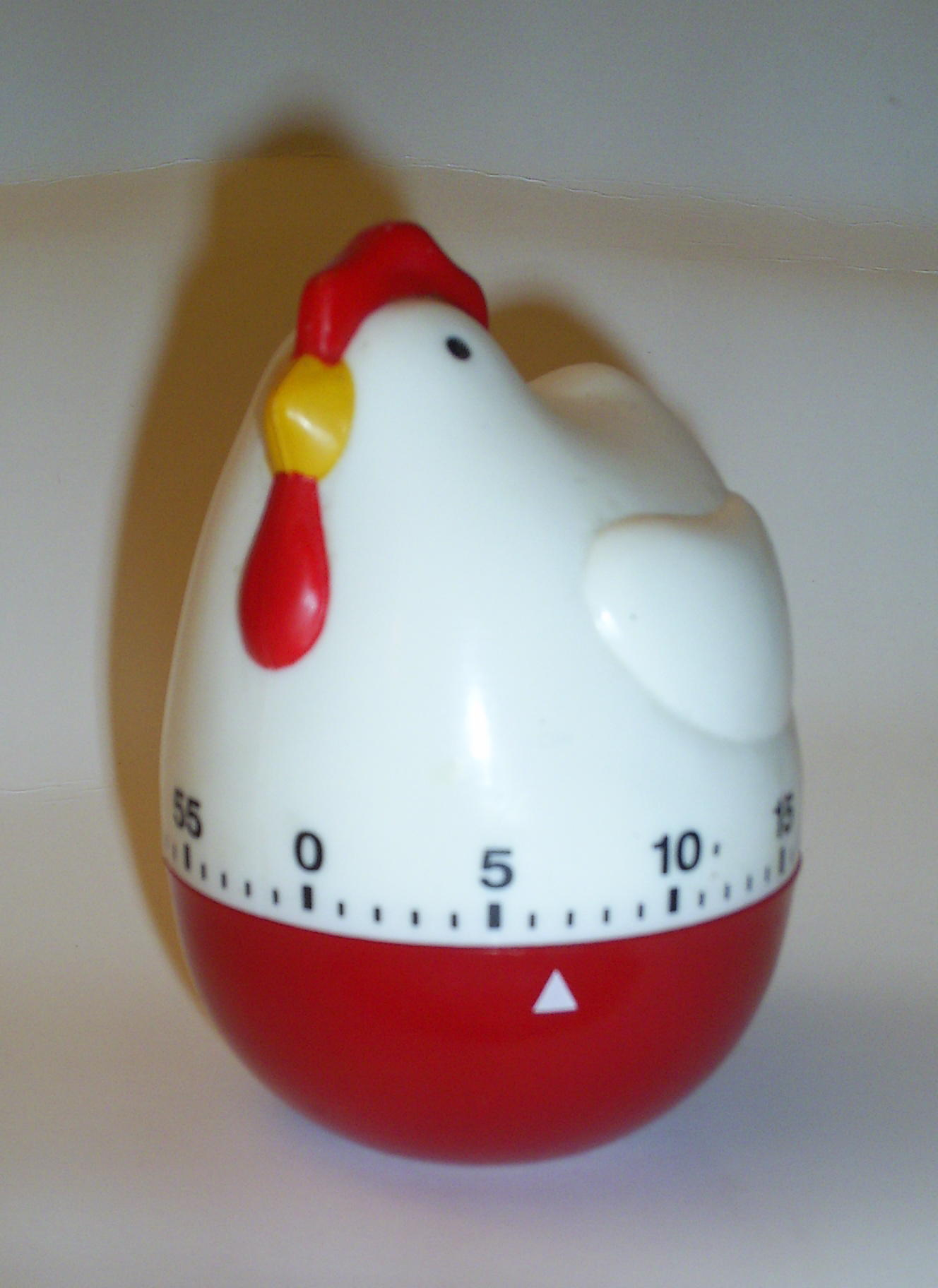
Mechanical clockwork egg or kitchen timer

New products have been developed which potentially allow for better egg timing; these use the temperature of the water in which the eggs are being cooked to indicate the cooking state of the eggs. This kind of timer has the potential to more accurately indicate the state of the egg while it is being cooked as they do not rely on certain conditions (water hardness, hob temperature, atmospheric pressure).

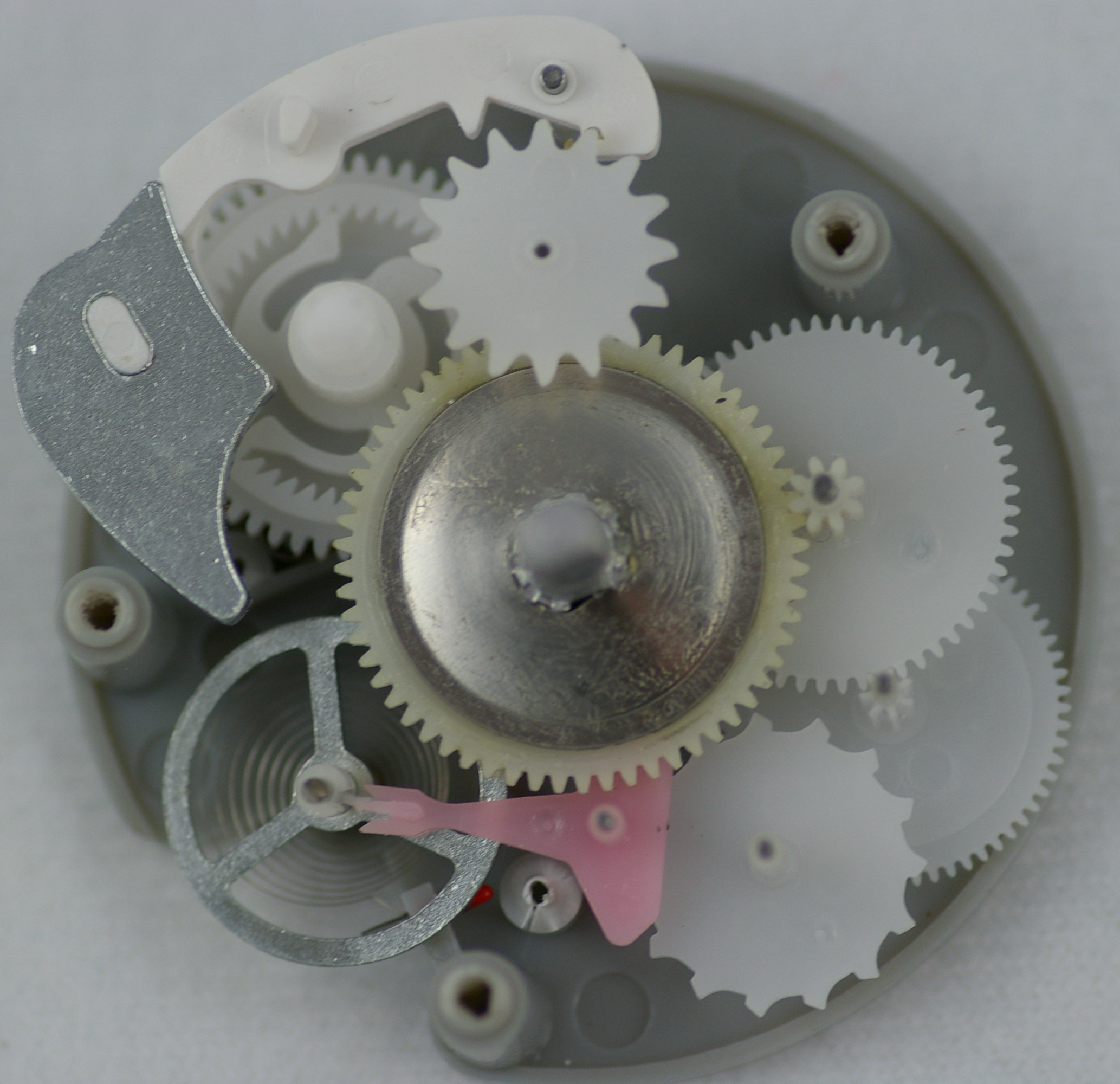
Clockwork mechanism of a mechanical egg timer

One such product is a thermochromic egg timer, first patented in the U.S. by Robert Parker in 1978. These timers are made of translucent plastic with a heat-sensitive coloured disc in the middle which changes colour at 80 °C (176 °F). The plastic around the disc changes temperature relatively steadily and gradually from the outside to the inside of the plastic mimicking how an egg heats up while cooking. This allows an observer to see the colour creep inwards through the disc and stop the boiling at the stage required. As it mimics the boiling of an egg, it will be accurate even if the boiling process is disrupted, a lower temperature is used and regardless of the quantity of eggs being cooked. Other similar products use electronics to sense the water temperature and play a certain tune or series of beeps to indicate the state of the eggs.

== Egg boiling ==
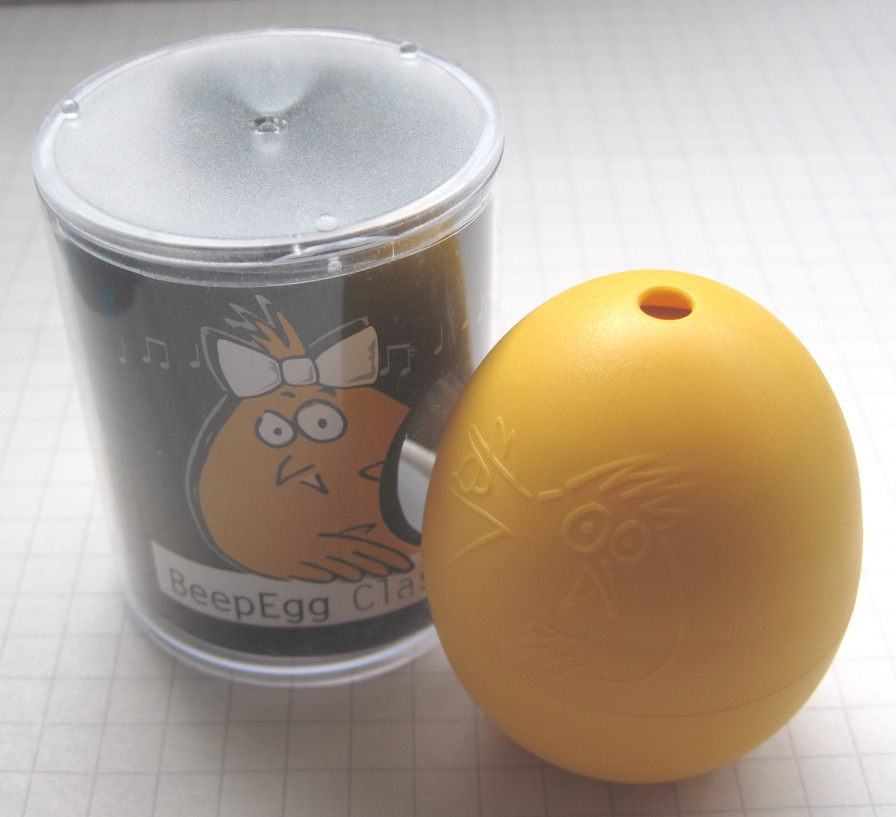
A musical electronic egg timer

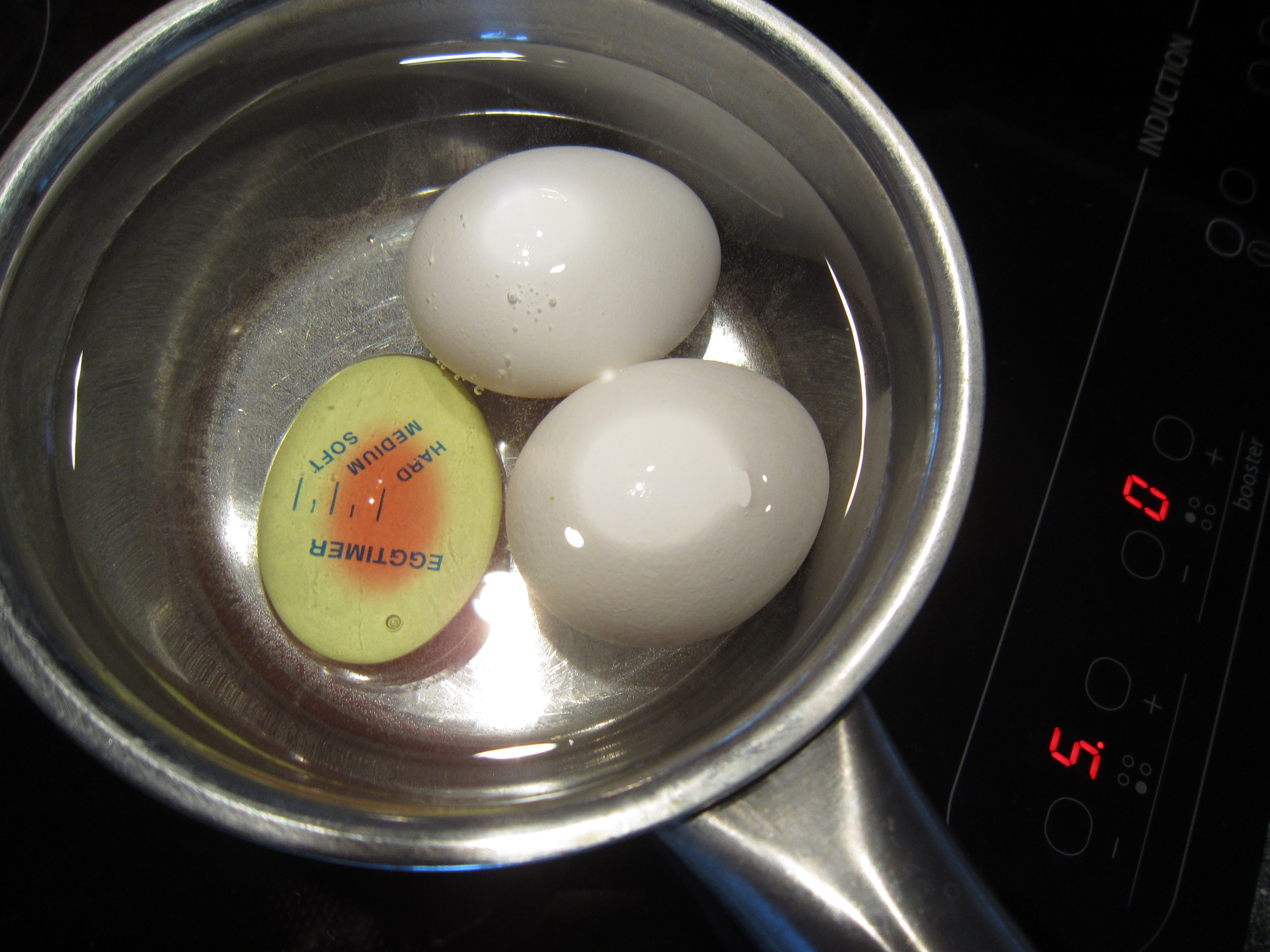
A colour-changing egg timer

Eggs consist of proteins which denature when heat is applied. They lose their shape and become long strands rather than tight masses. They then tangle with each other causing the liquid of the egg to become more and more viscous.

Most traditional egg timers have a set time of about three minutes, that being the approximate time it takes to cook an average sized hen's egg in water. Hard-boiled eggs take longer to cook. The three minute egg timer is for soft-boiled eggs. The egg changes rapidly during the first few minutes of cooking. The changes cannot be seen through the eggshell, so timing is important.

== Other timers ==
Countdown timers not specifically for eggs are also available for general kitchen and timing use. For example, the clockwork Memo Park timer had a countdown of up to sixty minutes and was sold attached to a keyring, its original purpose being to remind motorists when their parking meter was due to expire.
