= Photo-lab timer =

Timer for enlarging in dark room

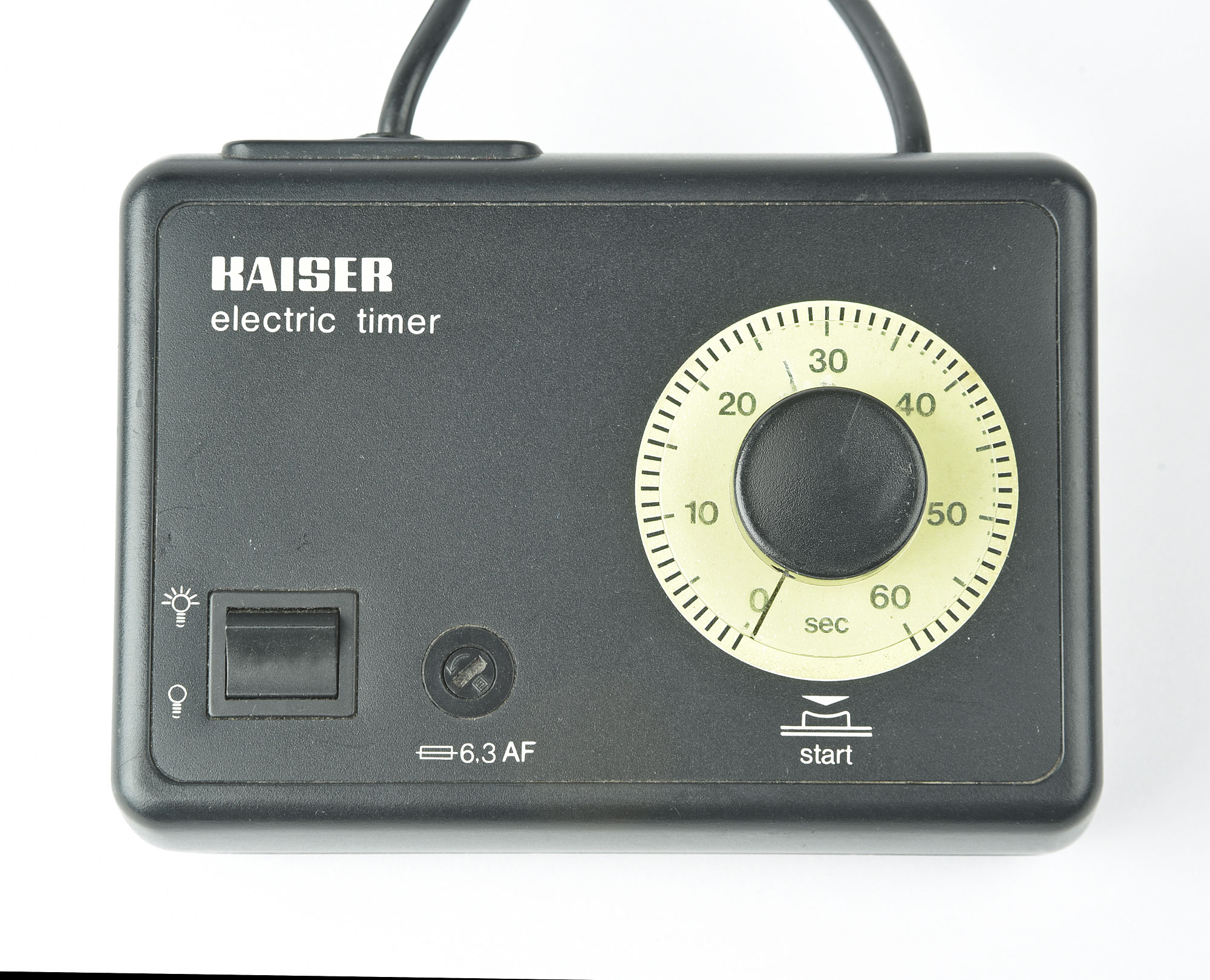
Electronic Timer-Analyzer

A photo-lab timer, photo interval timer, or darkroom timer is a timer used in photography for timing the process of projecting negatives to photosensitive paper with an enlarger, making photographic prints of them at any scale. It is a device which is attached to the photo lab enlarger to ensure that the duration of photo exposures on sensitive paper can be accurately timed. When the selected time has elapsed, the enlarger is switched off or an alarm is sounded, for the photographer to turn it off.

Initially they were conventional clocks, which were replaced by electromechanical timers, which were subsequently substituted entirely by electronic equipment.

== Operation ==
After specifying the exposure time, the supply of power to the enlarger is activated by pushing a start button, thus timing the exposure exactly. The selectable time range is typically from 1/10th of a second to one or more minutes. Most exposure timers also have a continuous light switch, which is especially helpful for framing and focusing. Depending on the version, the desired duty cycle is set by means of a mechanical dial with scale or a push-button arrangement along with a numerical display. Some variants allow the preselection of several stored timings, which can be called back from memory by a single button press.

== Mechanical ==
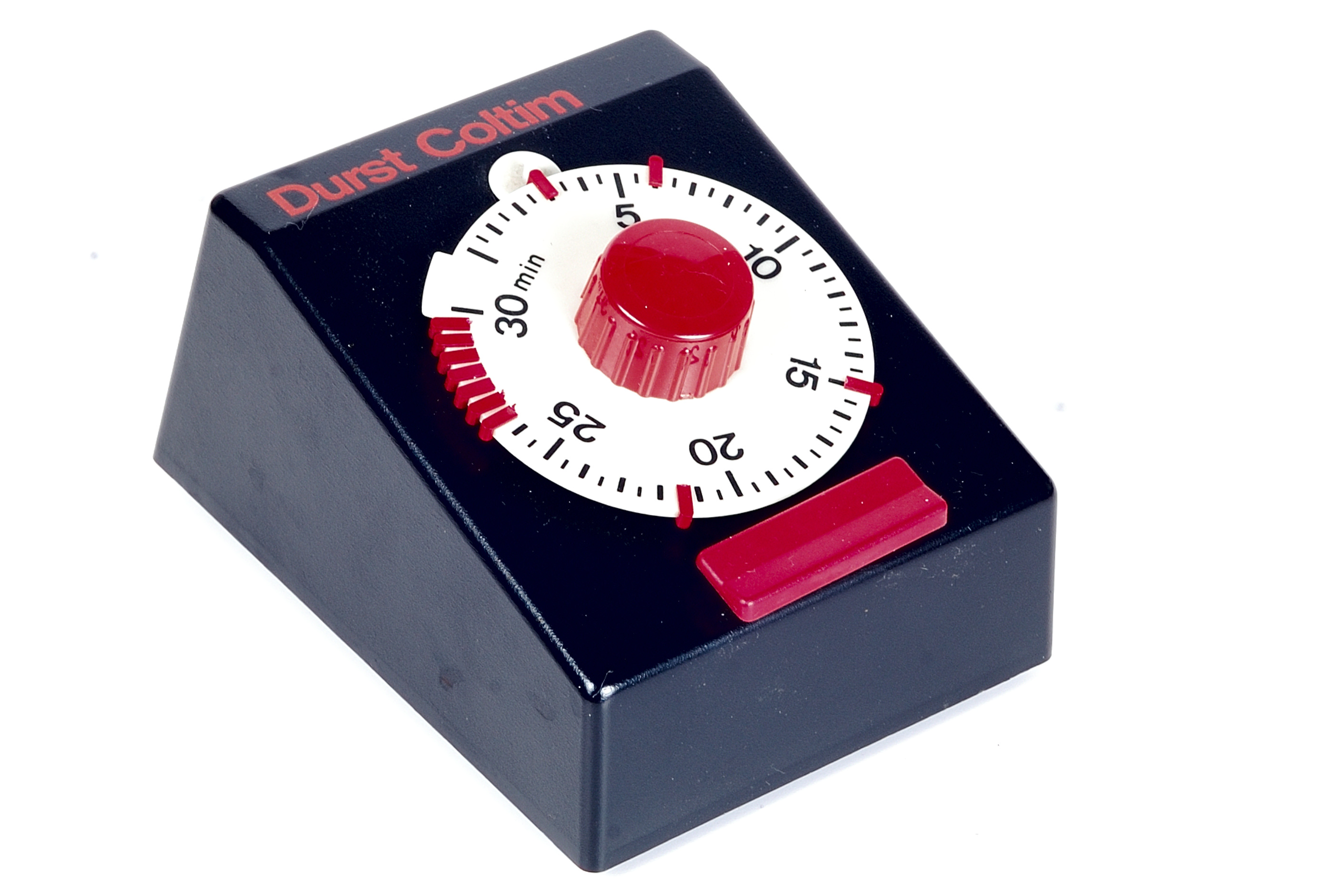
Durst Digitimer

Early photolab timers used a clockwork mechanism to measure time. Manual timers are usually set by turning a dial to the desired time interval, storing energy in a mainspring that operates the mechanism. They work in a way similar to a mechanical alarm clock, the energy of the mainspring causing a balance wheel to oscillate back and forth.

Each turn of the balance wheel lets the gear train advance a small, fixed amount, causing the dial to move steadily back until it reaches zero, switching off the enlarger or causing a lever arm to strike a bell. The mechanical enlarger timer was invented in the 1920s with a stabilizer that rotates being slowed down by the air resistance.

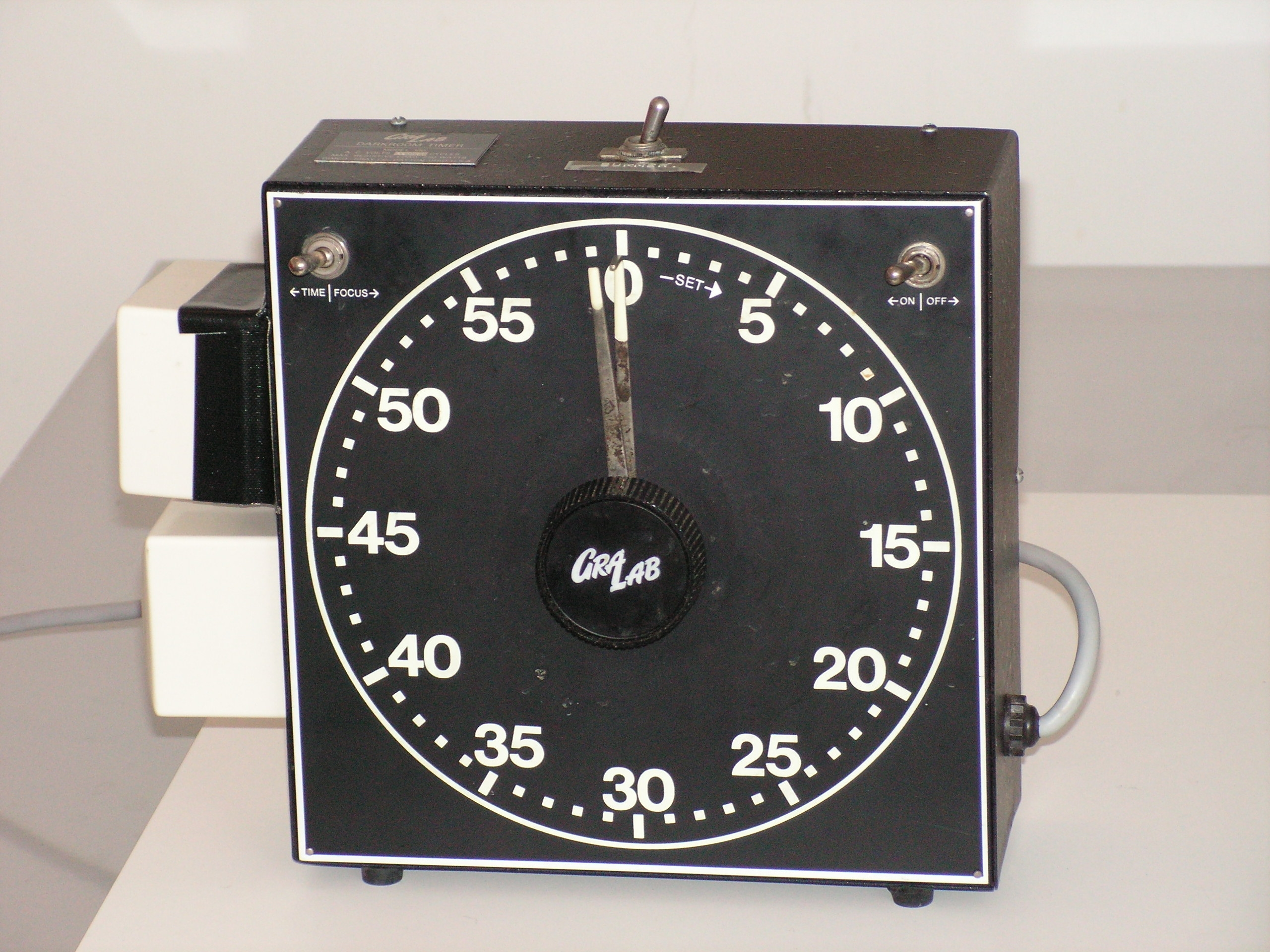
GraLab electromechanical timer

== Electromechanical ==
Short period electromechanical timers for enlargers use a mechanism driven by an AC synchronous motor without any electronic circuitry at all. When the selected time has elapsed, the enlarger is disconnected by means of the relay that kept it on.

The electric current feeds the synchronous motor which drives a demultiplying gear that rotates the "seconds hand" one turn every minute and simultaneously, the "minutes hand" one turn every hour, thus achieving timings of up to 60 minutes with an accuracy of a tenth of a second.

== Electronic ==
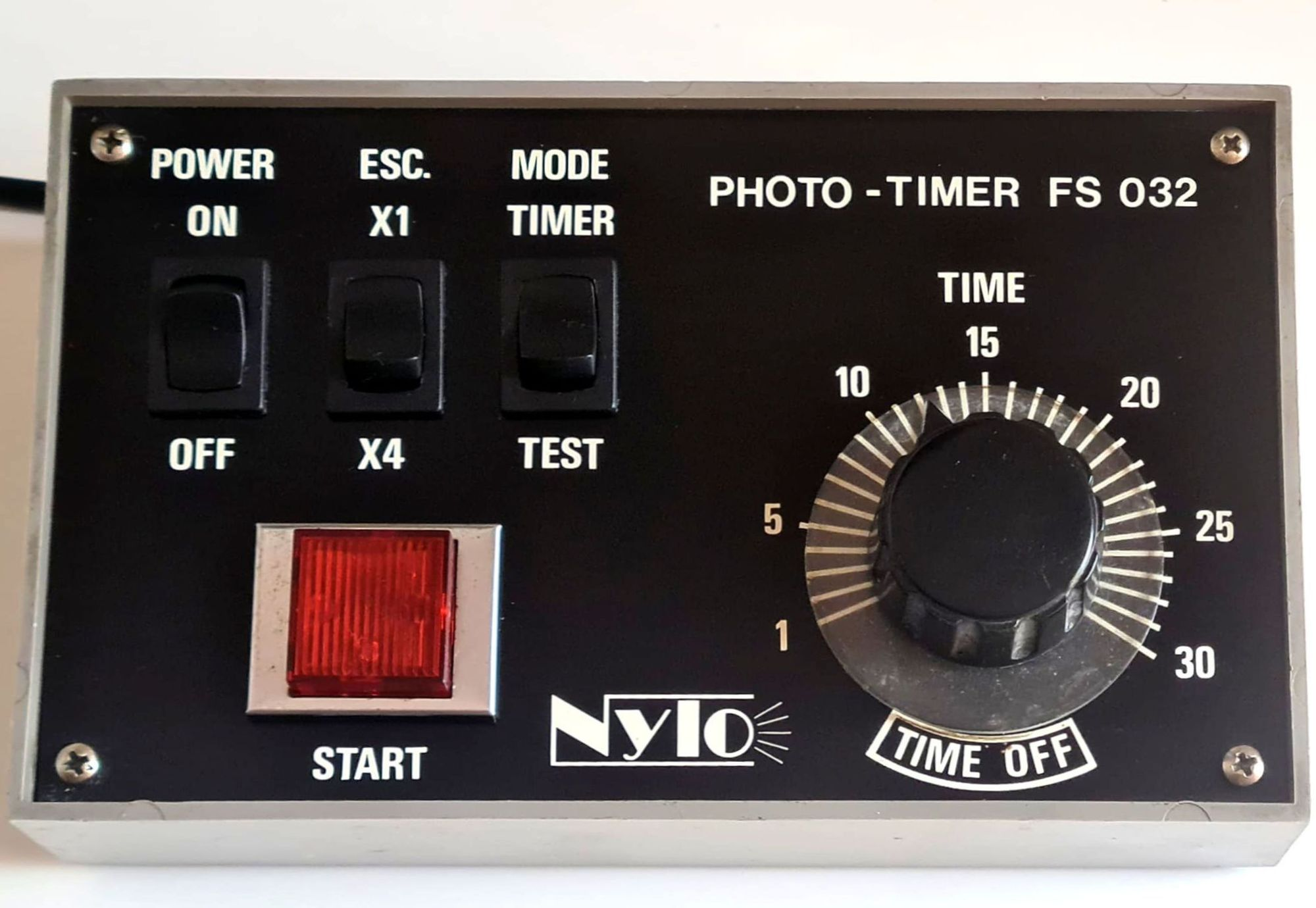
Electronic timer.

Electronic timers are essentially quartz clocks with special electronics and can achieve higher accuracy than mechanical or electromechanical timers. Electronic timers have digital electronics, but they normally have an analog or digital display.

Integrated circuits have made digital logic so cheap that an electronic timer is now less expensive than the classical mechanical or electromechanical timers. Individual timers are implemented as a simple single-chip computer system, similar to a clock and usually using the same, mass-produced technology.

== Automatic timer/analyzer ==
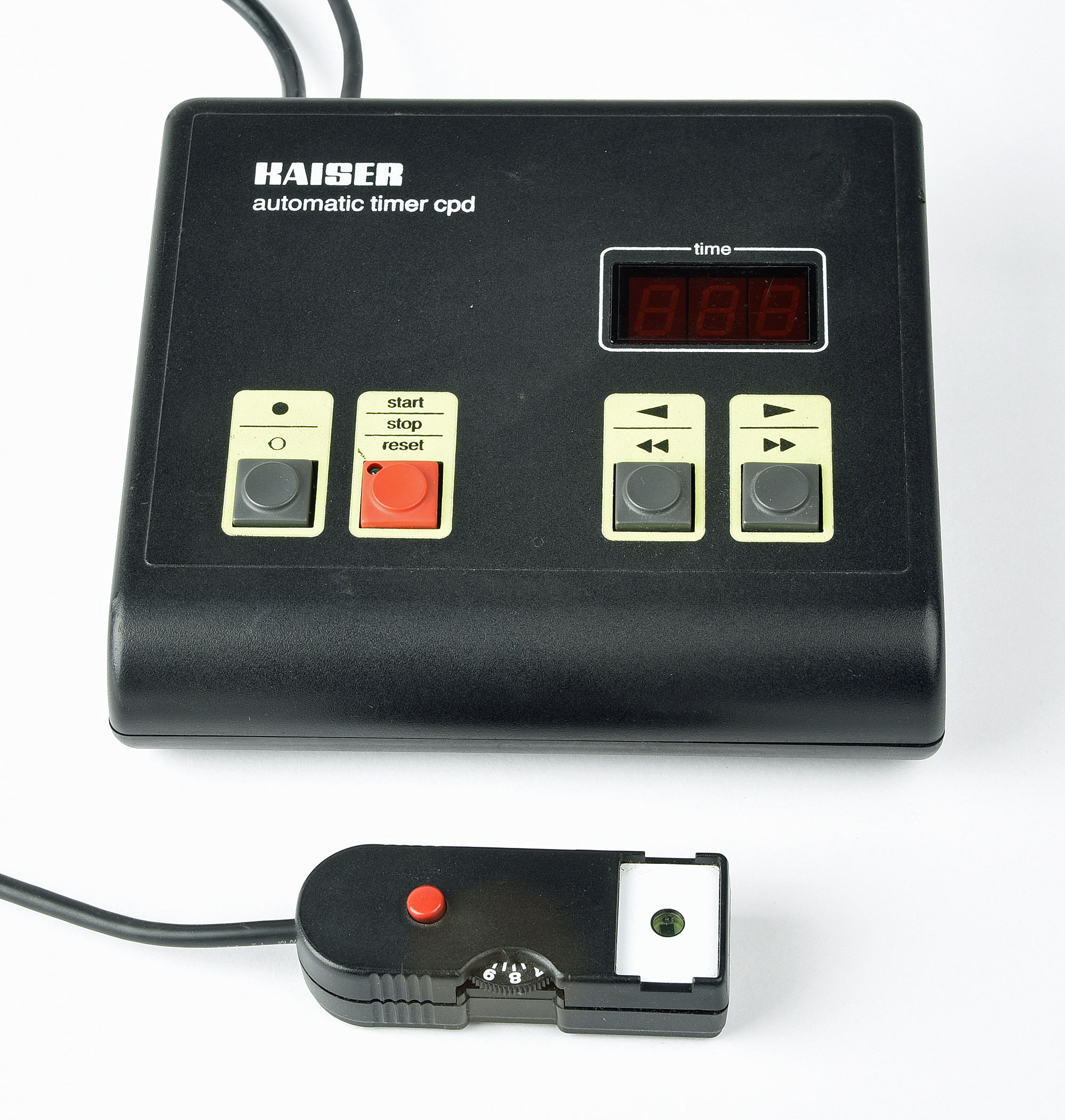
Electronic Timer and Analyzer

There is a type of automatic timer manufactured by Kaiser, Philips, and others that by means of a photoelectric sensor (like the one in the photo or mounted inside the easel), is capable of regulating the exposure time according to the light projected by the enlarger, through the negative, on the photographic paper, magnitude inversely proportional to the darkness of the negative and its the distance to the paper.

Automatic enlarger timer "Switch and exposure meter for B/W and color negatives and slides. Selective or integral exposure measurement using an independent metering head with a silicon optical sensor and converging lens. Three digits, display amber digital. Start button preparation screen. Time step in the time cycle with countdown to zero. Button to stop and resume the countdown of the remaining running time as well as refraction measurement with direct time reset. It can also be used as a manual exposure timer with setting the desired time using the up/down buttons.

== Gallery ==
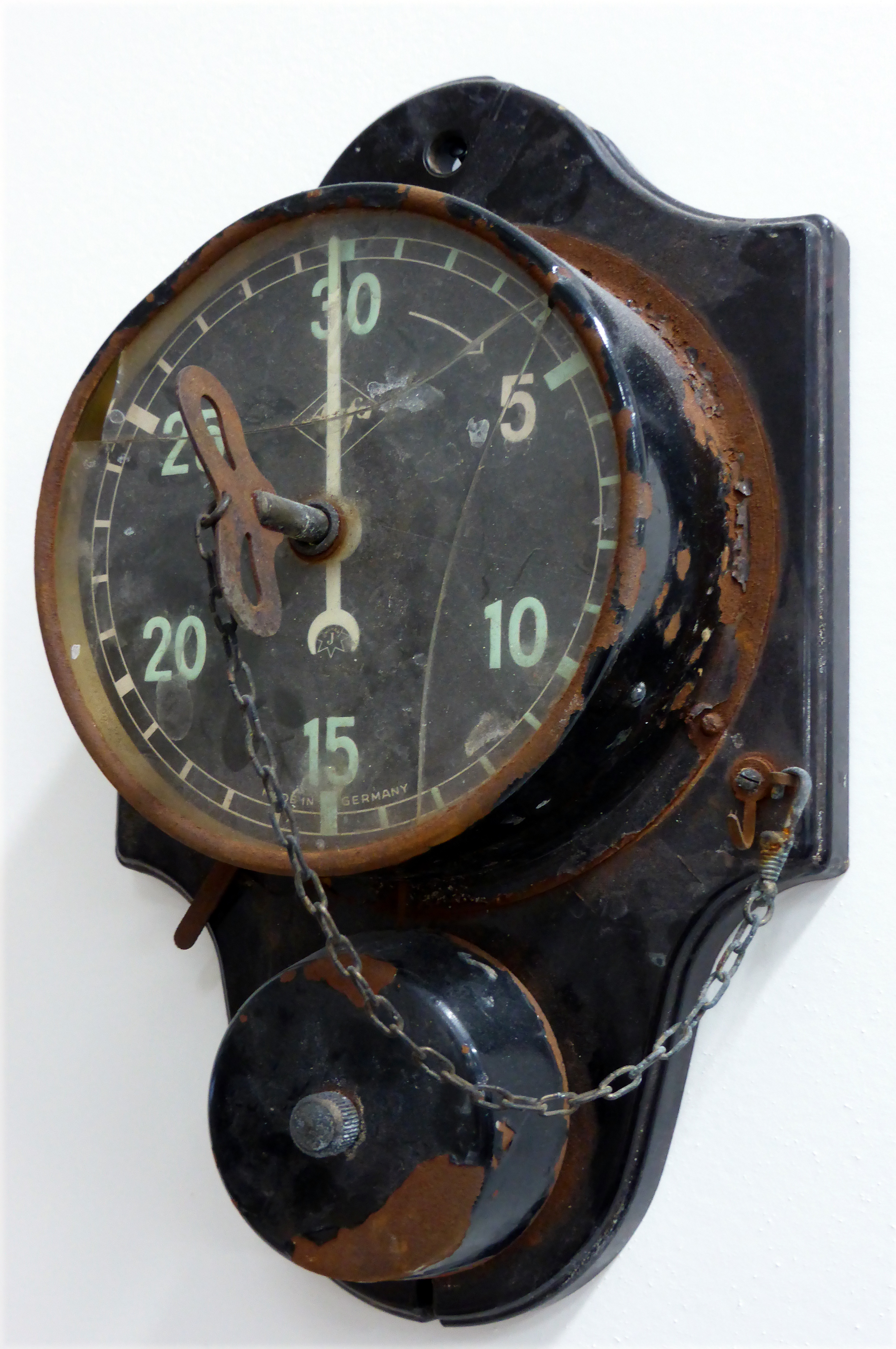
Agfa timer

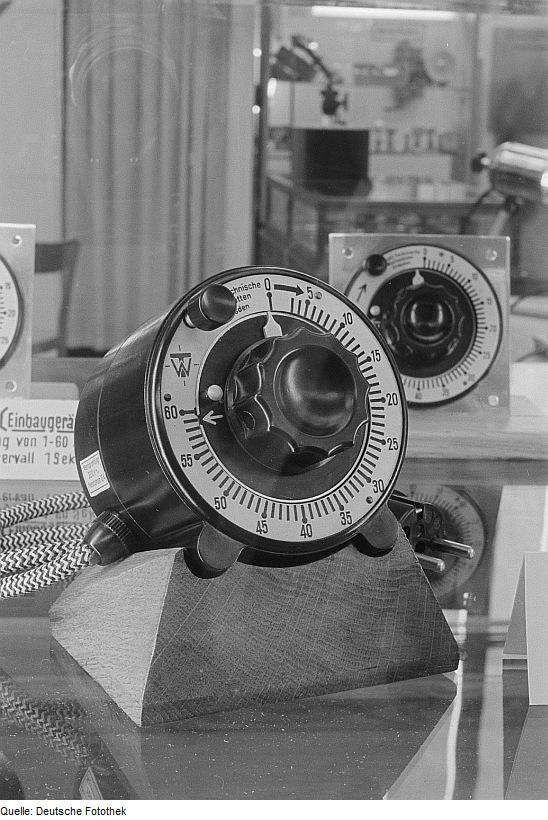
Fotothek Technische Werkstätten

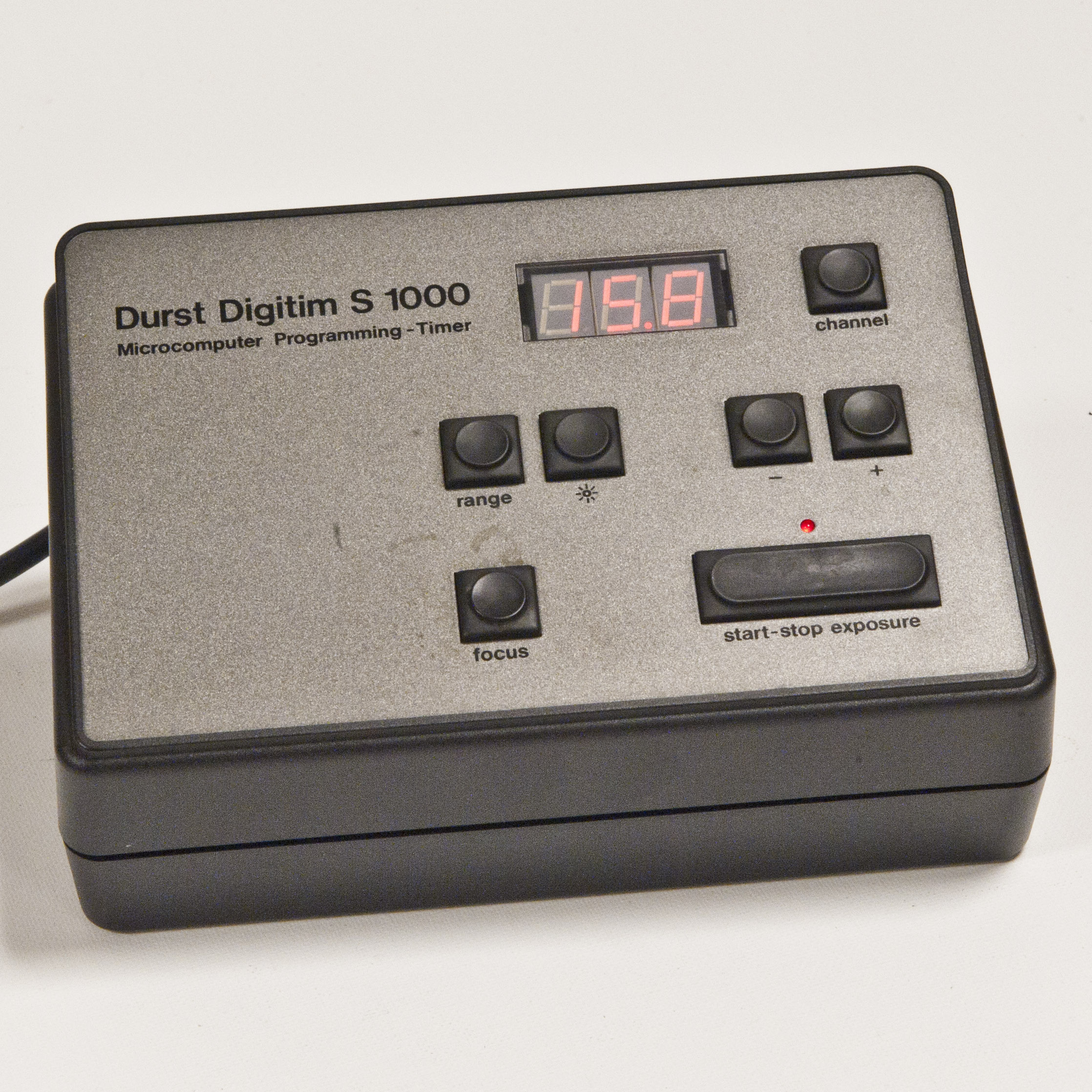
Durst-digitim

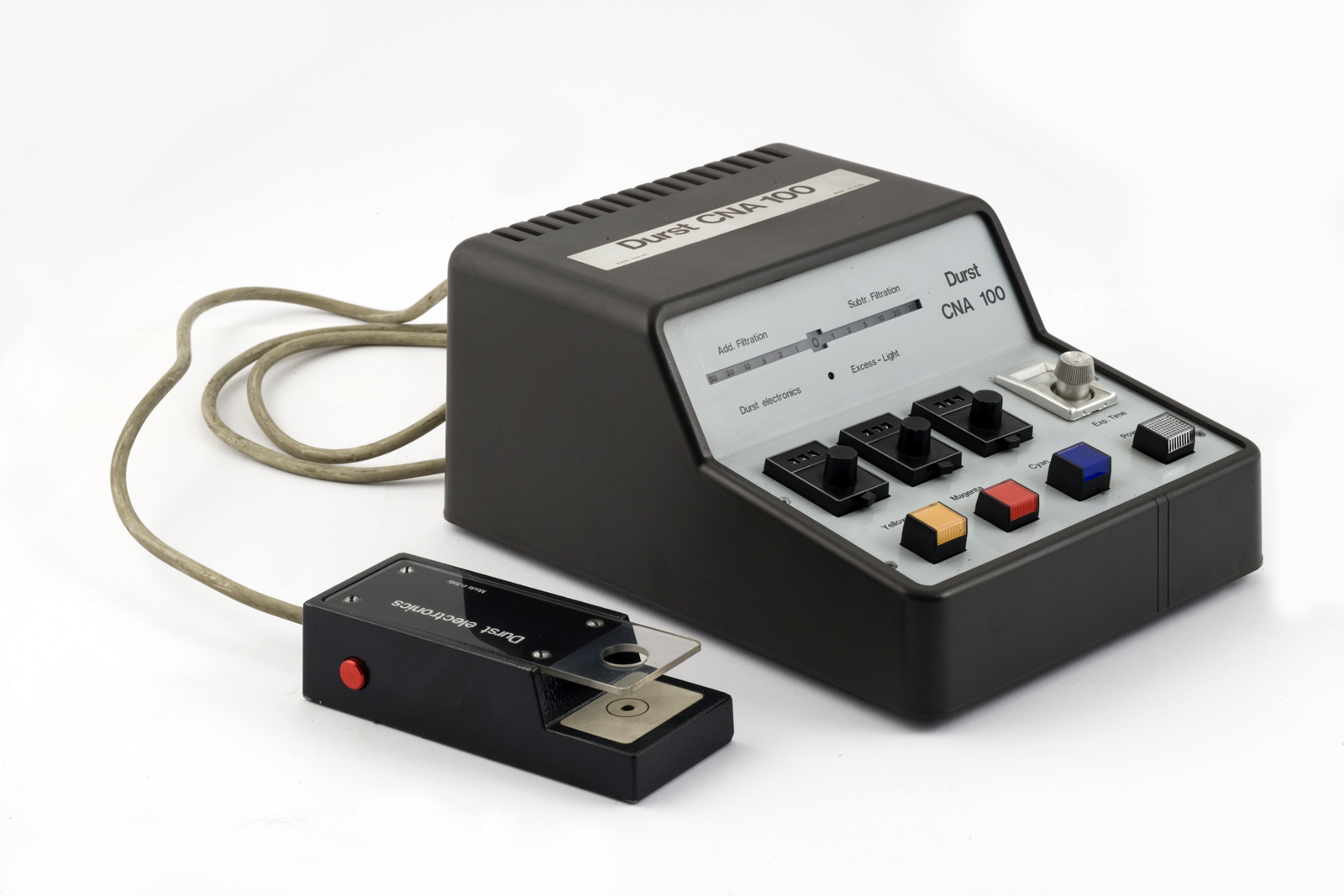
Electronic Timer and Analyzer
