= Keyswitch =

Keyswitch or key switch may refer to:

- Keyswitch, in computer keyboard technology
- Key switch, a key-operated switch
