= Motion tracker =

Motion tracker can refer to:

- Motion detector, a device that utilizes a sensor to detect nearby motion
- Motion capture, the process of recording the movement of objects or people
