= Twilight switch =

Electronic component

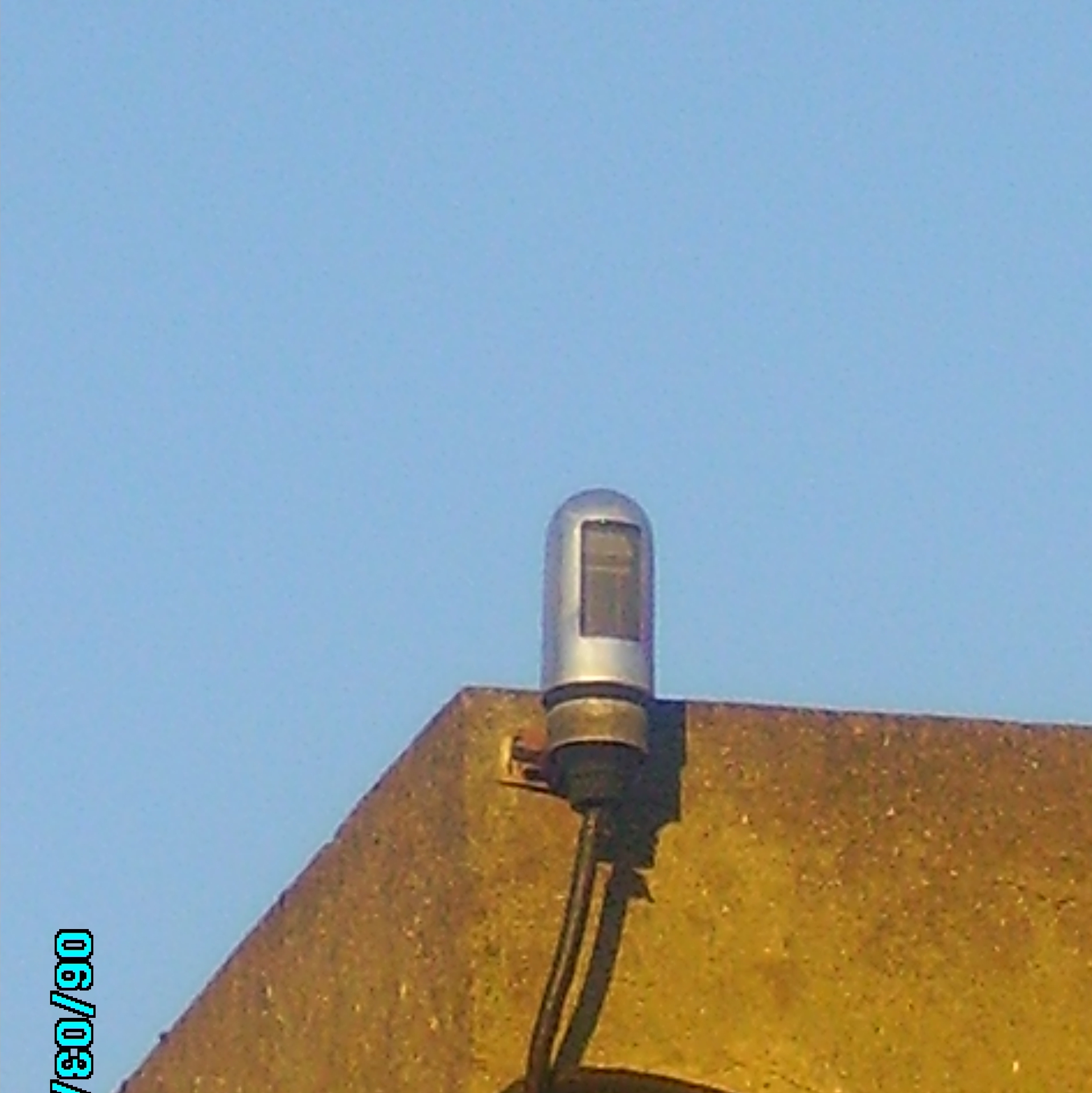
Probe placed on top of a wall

A twilight switch is an electronic component that allows the automatic activation of a lighting circuit when natural light drops in a given environment. Among a large number of uses, the most common is to enable automatic lighting of streets, roads, highways, roads, gardens, courtyards, etc., when sunlight drops below a certain level (e.g.: a from twilight).

A circuit built with a twilight switch, in some cases, requires other components, such as relays or contactors, when you want to control a higher electrical power (lamps, electrical appliances, etc.).

== Technical characteristics ==
By means of a light intensity sensor ( photoresistor, photodiode, phototransistor, etc.) that detects the amount of light that illuminates an environment, it triggers an electrical circuit that opens or closes the contacts of a mechanical relay or of a solid state relay. (power transistor, thyristor, triac, etc.), which activates the lighting system. Generally, the natural lighting that goes directly to a photoresistor is used, with the effect of a lamp that automatically turns on at dusk and always goes out in the first light of dawn. Thanks to this system, a wide range of examples of use are created, from lighting both public and private spaces to the simulation of presence, where the twilight switch provides the intermittent operation of a circuit. lighting to simulate the presence of people who are not physically present.

There are more and more innovative models that allow greater sensitivity to sunlight, with which you can adjust the threshold so that the switch fires at a certain level of darkness, thus setting a delay on and off with respect to the ambient light level. There are even models that do not turn on artificial light and distinguish it from natural light, although in some cases it may be convenient to combine them with time scheduling systems.

== Electromechanical sensor ==
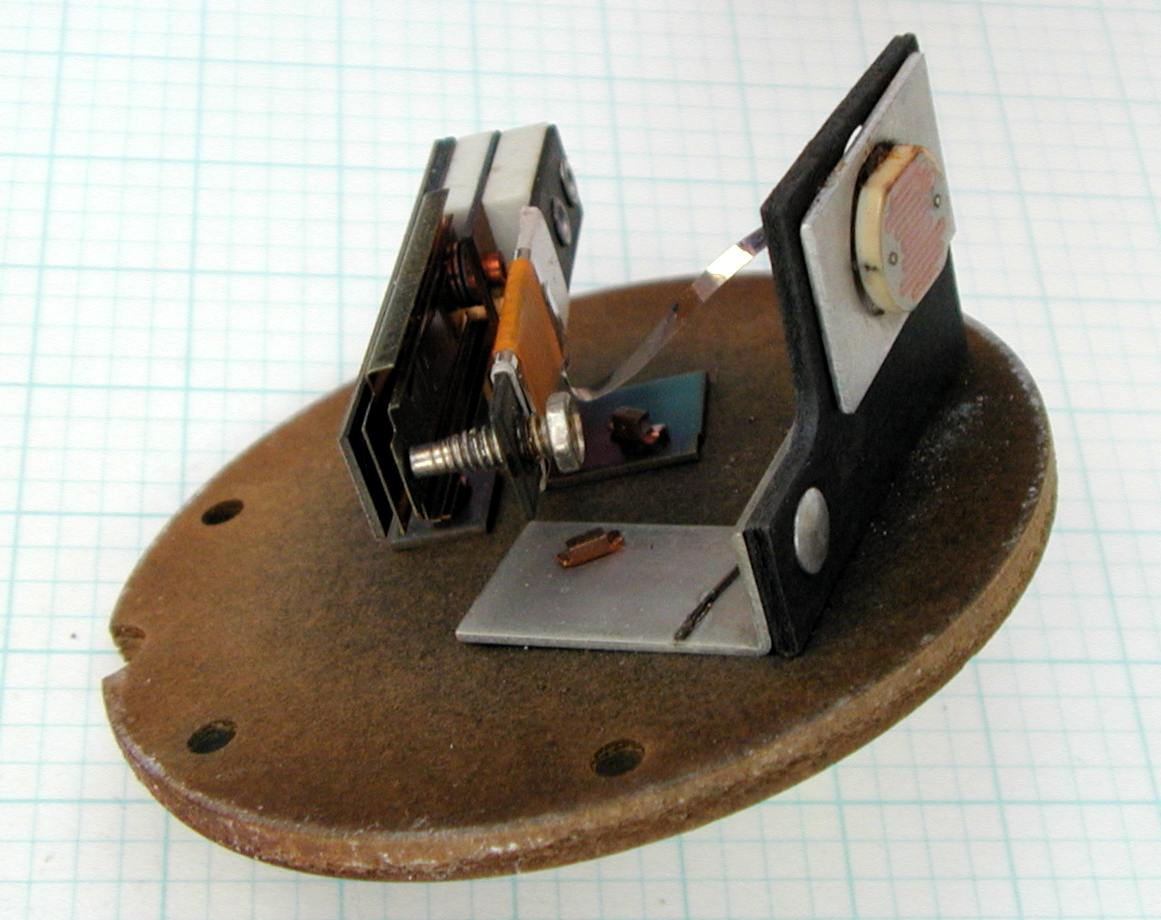
Electromechanical twilight switch

The most commonly used twilight switches are of the electromechanical type, which differ from electronic ones by the use of piloted relays already integrated in the circuit itself, and which allow small loads to be directly connected (for example, a single lamp). Twilight switches are available in various shapes to suit every need. In fact, they can vary from the shape of a lamp holder to that of a separate box (cylindrical, square, etc.).

Pay attention to the number of lamps that power the device and its power in watts, following the instructions in the user manual, in order to avoid a dangerous current overload on the contacts of the drive relay, in fact, if higher loads are required, a contactor will need to be inserted. For street lighting, for example, an individual twilight switch can be used, or a central switch that activates the other remote relays to turn on many lamps, so that the load that the central twilight switch must withstand is only of the individual coils of the relays in parallel.

== Advantages ==
The main benefit of using a twilight switch is the considerable energy savings it brings, combined with the convenience of unnecessary time scheduling, which effectively regulates sunlight.

== Disadvantages ==
The major downside to doing the installation is that if you place artificial light near a photo-sensitive detector, the switch may not turn on. In this case you have to be careful where the light bulbs are located with respect to the photodetectors. Also, keep in mind that ignition is based solely on the amount of natural light present and not on the height of the sun, so "unwanted ignition" may occur, for example in the presence of dense clouds associated with a significant drop in ambient light on the sensor (e.g., when there is a storm). To avoid this, twilight switches can be combined with time scheduling systems.

== Bibliography ==
- Helmut Röder, Heinz Ruckriegel, Heinz Häberle: Elektronik 1.Teil, Grundlagen Elektronik. 8. Auflage, Verlag Europa-Lehrmittel, Wuppertal, 1980, ISBN 3-8085-3178-9
- Wilhelm Gerster: Moderne Beleuchtungssysteme für drinnen und draussen. 1. Auflage, Compact Verlag, München, 1997, ISBN 3-8174-2395-0

== See also ==
- Timer
- Staircase timer
- Motion sensor
