= Dashpot =

Damper that resists motion via viscous friction

Diagramatic symbol used to represent a dashpot.

A dashpot, also known as a damper, is a mechanical device that resists motion via viscous damping. The resulting force is proportional to the velocity, but acts in the opposite direction, slowing the motion and absorbing energy. Kinetic energy is converted to heat. It is commonly used in conjunction with a spring.

== Types ==
The two most common types of dashpots are linear and rotary.

=== Linear dashpot ===
Simplified diagram of a linear dashpot.

Linear dashpots — or linear dampers — are used to exert a force opposite to a translation movement. They are generally specified by stroke (amount of linear displacement) and damping coefficient (force per velocity).

=== Rotary dashpot ===
Similarly, rotary dashpots will tend to oppose any torque applied to them, in an amount proportional to their rotational speed. Their damping coefficients will usually be specified by torque per angular velocity. One can distinguish two kinds of viscous rotary dashpots:

- Vane dashpots which have a limited angular range but provide a significant damping torque. The damping force is the result of one or multiple vanes moving through a viscous fluid and letting it flow via calibrated openings.
- Continuous rotation dashpots which aren't limited in their rotation angle but provide a smaller damping coefficient. These use the friction generated by the shearing forces induced in the viscous fluid itself by the difference in motion between the dashpot's rotor and stator.

=== Eddy current damper ===
A less common type of dashpot is an eddy current damper, which uses a large magnet inside a tube constructed of a non-magnetic but conducting material (such as aluminium or copper). Like a common viscous damper, the eddy current damper produces a resistive force proportional to velocity. A common use of the eddy current damper is in balance scales. This is a frictionless (while near rest) method that allows the scale to quickly come to rest.

== One-way operation ==
Dashpots frequently use a one-way mechanical bypass to permit fast unrestricted motion in one direction and slow motion using the dashpot in the opposite direction. This permits, for example, a door to be opened quickly without added resistance, but then to close slowly using the dashpot. For hydraulic dashpots this unrestricted motion is accomplished using a one-way check-valve that allows fluid to bypass the dashpot fluid constriction. Non-hydraulic rotatory dashpots may use a ratcheting gear to permit free motion in one direction.

== Theory ==
Dashpots are frequently used to add damping to dynamic systems. When designing and analyzing systems, dashpots are often assumed to be linear, meaning that their output force F is proportional to their velocity v. The direction of the force is opposite the velocity, giving the negative sign in the equation below, and the constant of proportionality often uses the symbol c.
$$F = - cv$$

This permits convenient analysis of systems such as harmonic oscillators. However, the behavior of real-world dashpots is frequently non-linear, meaning that the force is proportional to the velocity raised to some exponent α, which can vary between 0.2 and 2.0.
$$F = - cv^\alpha$$

Different exponents are better suited for different applications, but exponents other than 1 must be analyzed with numeric methods instead of calculus. Systems that use non-linear dampers (any exponent other than 1) are much more time-consuming to design and analyze than linear dampers.

== Applications ==
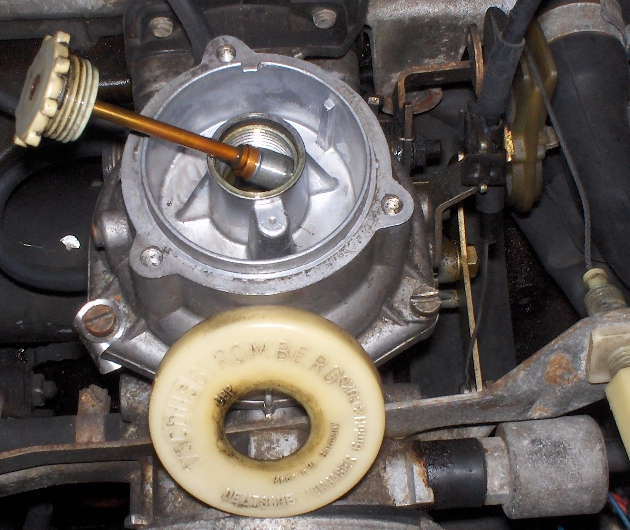
Dashpot in a Zenith-Stromberg carburetor

A dashpot is a common component in a door closer to prevent it from slamming shut. A spring applies force to close the door, which the dashpot offsets by forcing fluid to flow through an orifice, often adjustable, between reservoirs, which slows the motion of the door.

Consumer electronics often use dashpots where it is undesirable for a media access door or control panel to suddenly pop open when the door latch is released. The dashpot provides a steady, gentle motion until the access door has fully opened.

Dashpots are a key component in shock absorbers, used to cushion a vehicle against vibrations caused by an uneven road surface.

They are also used on carburetors, where the return of the throttle lever is cushioned just before the throttle fully closes, then is allowed to fully close slowly to reduce emissions. The British SU carburettor's main piston carries a stepped needle. This needle is held in the fuel flow orifice. The manifold vacuum causes this piston to rise allowing more fuel into the airflow. The SU's dashpot has a fixed hydraulic piston, damping the main piston as it moves upward. A valve in the piston disables the damping as the main piston returns.

Large forces and high speeds can be controlled by dashpots. For example, they are used to arrest the steam catapults on aircraft carrier decks.

Relays can be made to have a long delay by utilizing a piston filled with fluid that is allowed to escape slowly. Electrical switchgear may use dashpots in their overcurrent sensing mechanism to reduce reaction speed to brief events, thus making them less sensitive to false-triggering during transients whilst still remaining sensitive to sustained overloads. Another use is for delaying the closing or opening of an electrical circuit. Such a dashpot timer might be used for example for timed staircase lighting.

Anti-stall mechanisms in internal combustion engines are aimed to prevent stalling of the engine at low rpm. Anti-stall mechanisms use dashpots to arrest the final closing movement of the throttle.

Large dashpots are added to bridges and buildings to protect against earthquakes and wind vibrations. One notable example of this use is the repairs made to the Millennium Bridge in London after it was found to wobble when walked on.

== Viscoelasticity ==
Dashpots are used as models of materials that exhibit viscoelastic behavior, such as muscle tissue. Maxwell and Kelvin–Voigt models of viscoelasticity use springs and dashpots in series and parallel circuits respectively. Models containing dashpots add a viscous, time-dependent element to the behavior of solids, allowing complex behaviors like creep and stress relaxation to be modeled.

Analogous to electrical circuits, springs and dashpots can be modeled as capacitors and resistors, respectively.

== See also ==
- Hydrospring
- Hydro-spring
- Inerter (mechanical networks)
- Staircase timer
