= Friedrich von Knauss =

German watchmaker and inventor

- Born: February 7, 1724 or April 7, 1724; Aldingen or Ludwigsburg, Germany
- Died: August 14, 1789 (aged 65); Vienna, Austria
- Occupation(s): Watchmaker, inventor
- Years active: 1739–1778

Friedrich von Knaus(s) (February 7 or April 7, 1724 – August 14, 1789), was a German watchmaker and inventor who built clockwork mechanisms which could, in a simple way, play musical instruments, write short phrases, or conduct other individual, specialized tasks.

Von Knauss was born either in Aldingen or in Ludwigsburg. His father, Ludwig Knaus, was also a watchmaker. Friedrich had a brother, Ludwig Johann, whose year of birth is said to have been 1715 or 1716.

From 1739 into the 1750s, von Knauss was busy with the Darmstadt great duke's court, and in 1749 he became "Hofmechaniker", Imperial and Royial Court Mechanician. Together with his brother he produced the famous Kaiserliche Vorstellungsuhr (the Imperial Representation Watch) in 1750, commemorating the tenth anniversary of Maria Theresia's rise to the throne. In 1757, he completed work on a mechanical musician that played the flageolet, a kind of recorder. Some of his most famous constructs were four mechanical speaking heads in 1770; however, they were not very successful. A contest for mechanicians and organ manufacturers held in 1779 in Russia attests to their lack of success, in that the contest, held by the Academy of Sciences in St. Petersburg, used the production of a speaking head as the theme, and specified that the machine be capable of speaking the five vowels.

In 1778, Knauss was requested as a captain to the artillery of Vienna, where he died.
