= Dashpot timer =

Type of mechanical timer

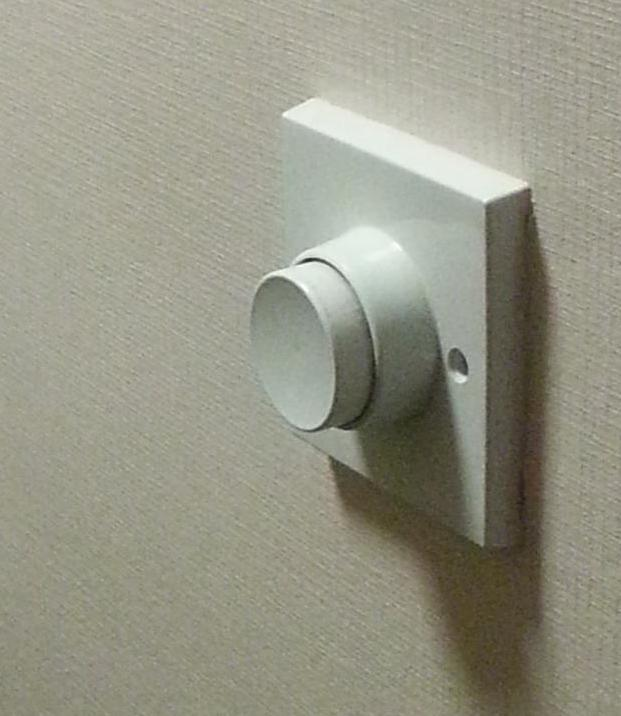
Typical UK staircase timer lighting switch, using a pneumatic dashpot timer

The first automatic timer, the dashpot timer has been used in many different machines and has many variations. Pneumatic, hydraulic-action, and mercury displacement timers. Being used in a variety of things such as printing presses, motors, and even irrigation systems, the dashpot timer has seen many applications. Even in modern times with electrical and digital timers, these old mechanical timers are still in use due to their simplicity and ability to function in tough environments.

== Types ==
The dashpot timer is a fluid time-on-timer that can be used in definite time motor acceleration starters and controllers. A dashpot timer is a container, a piston, and a shaft. The dashpot timer functions when a magnetic field forces a piston to move within a cylinder when the coil is energized. The movement of the piston is limited by fluid passing through an orifice on the piston. The amount of fluid passing through the orifice is controlled by a throttle value, which determines the delay. If the fluid used to move the piston is air it is actually known as a pneumatic dashpot. If the fluid is oil, it is known as a hydraulic dashpot. Another kind of dashpot timer is the mercury displacement timer, this model uses mercury to contact electrodes.

=== Pneumatic timer ===
The pneumatic timer consists of a timing disk, filter, diaphragm, solenoid coil, operating spring and a solenoid core. When the pneumatic timer is energized, the solenoid core moves up into the coil. When this occurs, the core applies pressure on the diaphragm. This moves the diaphragm into the top chamber, air trapped in the chamber is expelled through the needle valve timing disk. In pneumatic timers the amount of delay that occurs can be altered by adjusting the needle valve. Pneumatic timers are very reliable and have a very long operational life expectancy

=== Hydraulic-action timers ===
Hydraulic dashpots or hydraulic-action timers are similar in appearance and operation to pneumatic timers. Hydraulic-action timers work by energizing the solenoid coil which pulls the hollow core into the center of the coil. Fluid in the hollow core is then forced to go through an orifice at the top, a one way check valve at the bottom of the hollow core prevents the fluid from escaping through the bottom. After the fluid is expelled, the core completes its upward movement and closes an air gap in the core, which in turn increases its electromagnetic field strength. When the coil becomes de-energized, it releases the core, and fluid is forced back into the hollow area of the core through the check valve, so the fluid is used again next time the coil is energized. Hydraulic action timers are usually designed for a specific time, which is set in the factory during their manufacture. These timers are also very reliable.

=== Mercury-displacement timers ===
Another important classification of dashpot timers are mercury-displacement timers. These depend on the displacement of a pool of mercury that make connection with two electrodes. There are two kinds of mercury displacement timers, delayed-make displacement timers and slow break displacement timers. Delayed-make displacement timers work by having a plunger floating in a container of mercury, when energy is applied to the coil it pulls the plunger into its center. The mercury that is displaced by this enters the thimble though an orifice. Inert gas trapped at the top of the thimble prevents the mercury from rising. Eventually the gas escapes through a ceramic plug, and this permits mercury to fill the thimble. When the mercury rises to a certain level it makes contact between electrodes. The amount of delay that this produces is determined when it is manufactured. Slow-break displacement timers work in the same way as delayed-make displacement timers only that when the coil is de-energized, the plunger rises to its original position, and mercury flows through the orifice to reach outside level. when it falls below the lip of the ceramic cup, electrical contacts become open. Its physical size is used to regulate the delay time of connection break. These timers are designed with a fixed delay period, usually to a maximum of 20 minutes.

== Application ==
Most dashpot timers are used in sequential, automatic control applications where the completion of one operation causes the start of another process. Common applications include automatic milling machines, periodic lubrication, animated shop-window displays, staged start-up of pumps, automatic presses, and industrial washing machines. Dashpot timers are also used in motors, blowers, lighting, public restroom faucets, and control valves as well as in banking, retail, irrigation, and general industrial applications. Common problems with dashpot timers were variations in temperature, the entrance of dirt and other matter into the dashpot system, and general wear and tear of the system.

Every kind of dashpot timer has seen use in different technologies, from toasters to automated factory operations. The dashpot timer, or mechanical timer, has changed the way we use technology. With its many industrial and commercial applications, to household appliances and gardening, the dashpot timer is a very important invention that has certainly led to many changes in how thing were done during the 20th century and how things are done in modern times. In modern times, even though we have electrical and digital timers, mechanical timers are still used, especially in cases where the environment is not friendly for electronics. Another advantage of mechanical timers is that they are easy to repair. The amount of precise automated systems used in modern factories shows the usefulness and precision of these timers, while their presence in many households shows their availability and inexpensiveness. Even with the small problems that are present in these systems they have proven themselves reliable enough to be used in many fields for nearly a century.
