= Timer =

Clock for measuring time duration

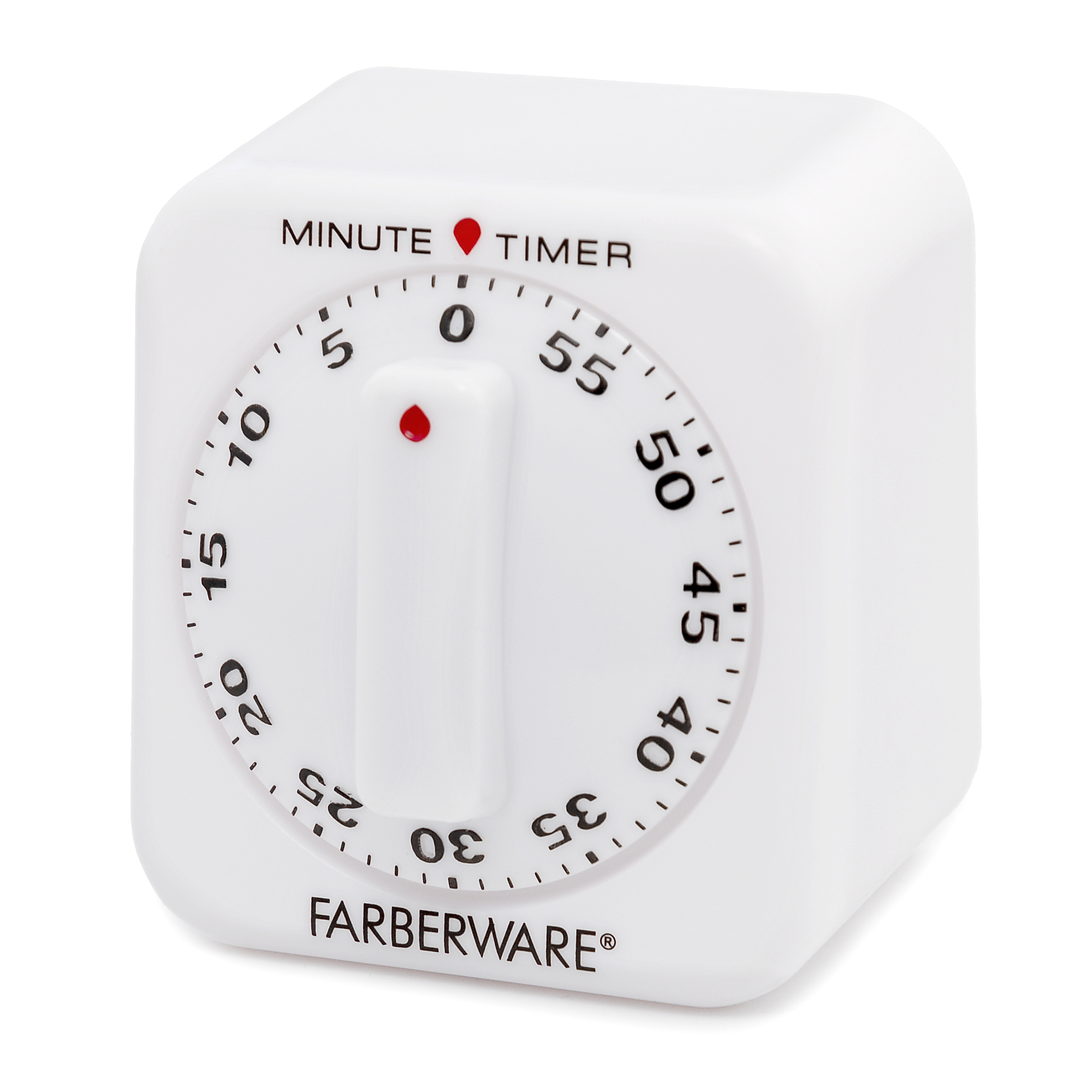
A typical kitchen timer

A timer or countdown timer is a type of clock that starts from a specified time duration and stops upon reaching 00:00. It can also usually be stopped manually before the whole duration has elapsed. An example of a simple timer is an hourglass. Commonly, a timer triggers an alarm when it ends. A timer can be implemented through hardware or software. Stopwatches operate in the opposite direction, upwards from 00:00, measuring elapsed time since a given time instant. Time switches are timers that control an electric switch.

== Hardware ==
=== Mechanical ===
Mechanical timers use clockwork to measure time. Manual timers are typically set by turning a dial to the time interval desired, turning the dial stores energy in a mainspring to run the mechanism. They function similarly to a mechanical alarm clock, the energy in the mainspring causes a balance wheel to rotate back and forth. Each swing of the wheel releases the gear train to move forward by a small fixed amount, causing the dial to move steadily backward until it reaches zero when a lever arm strikes a bell. The mechanical kitchen timer was invented in 1926.

The simplest and oldest type of mechanical timer is the hourglass - which is also known as "the glass of the hour" - in which a fixed amount of sand drains through a narrow opening from one chamber to another to measure a time interval.

=== Electromechanical ===
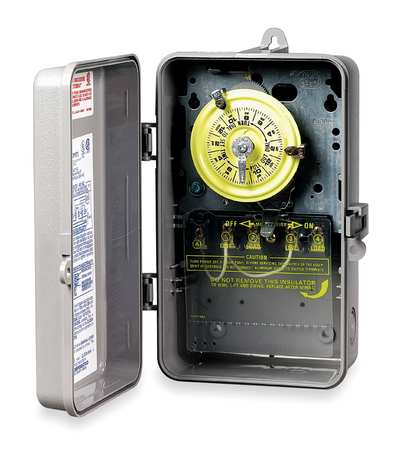
An electromechanical timer

Short-period bimetallic electromechanical timers use a thermal mechanism, with a metal finger made of strips of two metals with different rates of thermal expansion sandwiched together, steel and bronze are common. An electric current flowing through this finger causes heating of the metals, one side expands less than the other, and an electrical contact on the end of the finger moves away from or towards an electrical switch contact. The most common use of this type is in the "flasher" units that flash turn signals in automobiles, and sometimes in Christmas lights. This is a non-electronic type of multivibrator.

An electromechanical cam timer uses a small synchronous AC motor turning a cam against a comb of switch contacts. The AC motor is turned at an accurate rate by the alternating current, which power companies carefully regulate. Gears drive a shaft at the desired rate, and turn the cam. The most common application of this timer now is in washers, driers and dishwashers. This type of timer often has a friction clutch between the gear train and the cam, so that the cam can be turned to reset the time.

Electromechanical timers survive in these applications because mechanical switch contacts may still be less expensive than the semiconductor devices needed to control powerful lights, motors and heaters.

In the past, these electromechanical timers were often combined with electrical relays to create electro-mechanical controllers. Electromechanical timers reached a high state of development in the 1950s and 1960s because of their extensive use in aerospace and weapons systems. Programmable electromechanical timers controlled launch sequence events in early rockets and ballistic missiles. As digital electronics has progressed and dropped in price, electronic timers have become more advantageous.

Nowadays, many timers are implemented in software. Modern controllers use a programmable logic controller (PLC) instead of a box full of electromechanical parts. The logic is usually designed as if it were relays, utilizing a special computer language called ladder logic. In PLCs, timers are usually simulated by the software built into the controller. Each timer is just an entry in a table maintained by the software.

Computer systems typically have at least one hardware timer. These are typically digital counters that either increment or decrement at a fixed frequency, which is often configurable, and which interrupt the processor when reaching zero. An alternative design uses a counter with a sufficiently large word size that it will not reach its overflow limit before the end of life of the system.

More sophisticated timers may have comparison logic to compare the timer value against a specific value set by software, which triggers some action when the timer value matches the preset value. This might be used, for example, to measure events or generate pulse-width modulated waveforms to control the speed of motors (using a class D digital electronic amplifier).

=== Electronic ===
Electronic timers typically employ a quartz crystal oscillator to pace a digital timer, which can achieve higher precision than mechanical timers. In some cases they may also have an analog or digital display. Some timers are implemented as a simple single-chip system, such as those used in digital watches.

A special use of electronic timers in computer systems is as watchdog timers, which are designed to trigger a hardware reset of the system if the software fails.

== Mission timer ==
Mission timers have been used to measure the duration of an operation, or used as a countdown to a deadline to complete a mission. Such devices have been used by Space organisations.

During World War II, precision and timing were crucial for the success of numerous military operations. This necessity gave birth to the development of specialized mission timers, which were essentially high-precision chronographs designed specifically for military use. These mission timers play a pivotal role in coordinating attacks, navigation, and other critical aspects of military operations.

A mission timer typically features a robust rugged design to withstand the harsh conditions of war and engineered to provide an accurate measurement of short time periods, which are essential for tasks such as bombing runs or submarine dives. The face of the timer are often large and clearly marked, allowing operators to read it quickly and under low-light conditions. The functionality of mission timers extend beyond mere timekeeping; they help in calculating speed, distance, and fuel consumption as well. By enabling precise timing, these devices ensure that complex maneuvers could be executed with a higher degree of coordination and synchronization among allied forces. In essence, mission timers are not just timekeeping tools but instruments that contribute significantly to the strategic effectiveness of military operations during times of war.

== Software ==
These types of timers are not devices nor parts of devices, they exist only as software. They rely on the accuracy of a clock generator usually built into a hardware device that runs the software.

Many timer apps have been developed that mimic an old mechanical timer, but which have also highly sophisticated functions. These apps are also easier to use, because they are available at once, without any need to purchase or carry separate devices. Timers can be software applications phones, smartwatches, or tablets. Some of these apps are countdown timers, stopwatches, etc. These timer apps can be set for a specific time and can be used for tracking working or training time, motivating children to do tasks, replacing an hourglass-form egg timer in board games such as Boggle, or for the traditional purpose of tracking time when cooking.

Apps may be superior to hour glasses, or to mechanical timers. Hour glasses are not precise and clear, and they can jam. Mechanical timers lack the customization that applications support, such as sound volume adjustments for individual needs. Most applications will also offer selectable alarm sounds.

Some timer applications can help children to understand the concept of time, help them to finish tasks in time, and help them to get motivated. These applications are especially used with children with disabilities like ADHD.

== See also ==
- Candle clock
- Countdown
- Time lock
- Drip irrigation
- Egg timer
- Intervalometer
- Staircase timer
- Time to digital converter
- Water clock
- Photo-lab timer
- List of 24-hour watch brands
