= Staircase timer =

Timed electrical lighting switch

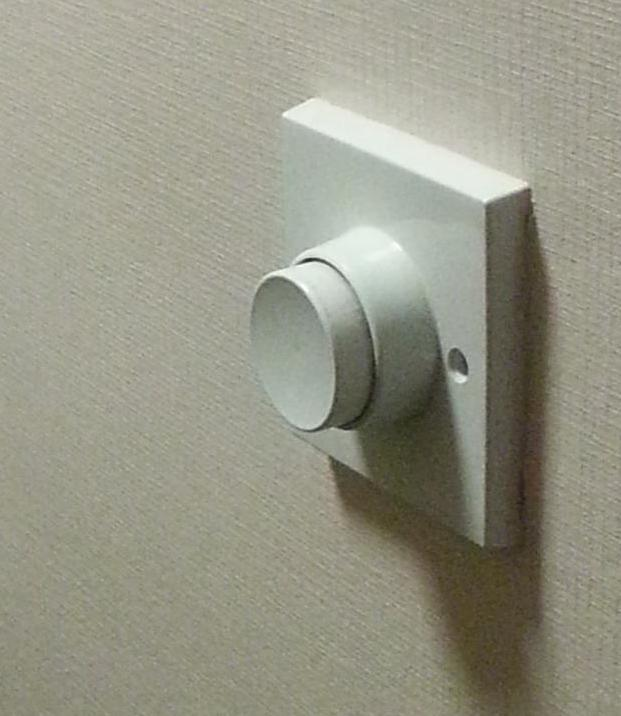
Typical UK pneumatic delay pushbutton switch

A staircase timer is an electrical switch used to control lighting on a staircase, corridor or lobby. A single action turns on the lights and they remain on for long enough to ascend or descend the stairs. The lights then turn themselves off automatically.

== Operation ==
In a single occupancy domestic dwelling it is usual to provide multiple switching locations. The lights may be turned on or off from either the top, bottom or intermediate floors of the staircase. They remain on until turned off manually.

In a multiple occupancy dwelling, the drawback is that the cost of shared lighting is usually paid by the landlord. Individual tenants turn lights on, but have little reason to turn them off. Particularly so in the days of incandescent lamps this could be an appreciable cost. For this reason shared dwellings favour timers for staircases instead. The lights are turned on by a push-button switch on any floor. They remain on automatically for an adequate time to climb the stairs, then turn themselves off.

To provide longer lighting times when required the button may be pressed repeatedly. For this reason any timer should be a retriggerable monostable, i.e. the off delay lasts from the time of the last button press. There may also be a switch, sometimes a key switch, that can turn the lights on indefinitely for tasks such as cleaning.

== Pneumatic timers ==
The first staircase timers were pneumatic pushbuttons as dashpot timers. A large push-button, distinctly larger than a normal electrical switch, is pressed manually. An internal mechanism provides the delay. The internal piston is depressed by the button and holds the electrical contacts closed. This piston is spring-loaded to return upwards but is prevented from returning quickly by a pneumatic dashpot. This dashpot provides the timing function.

== Electronic timers ==
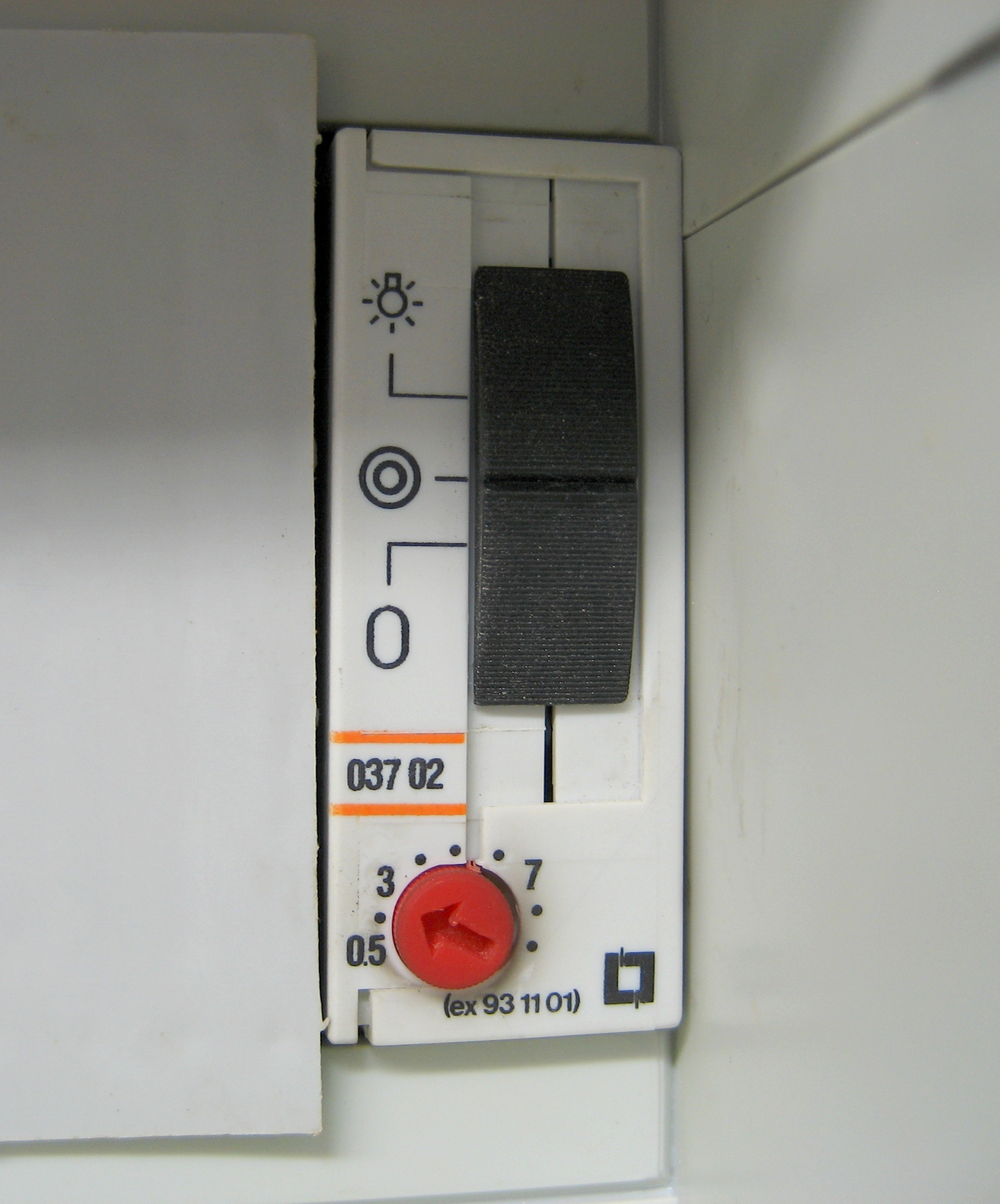
DIN rail mounted electronic lighting timer

An electronic timer allow simple push-buttons to be used. One timer is installed controlling the lights and any number of push-buttons, without pneumatic timers and connected in parallel, are used to trigger it. With many push-buttons, the cost savings for equipment may be substantial.

== Occupancy detectors ==
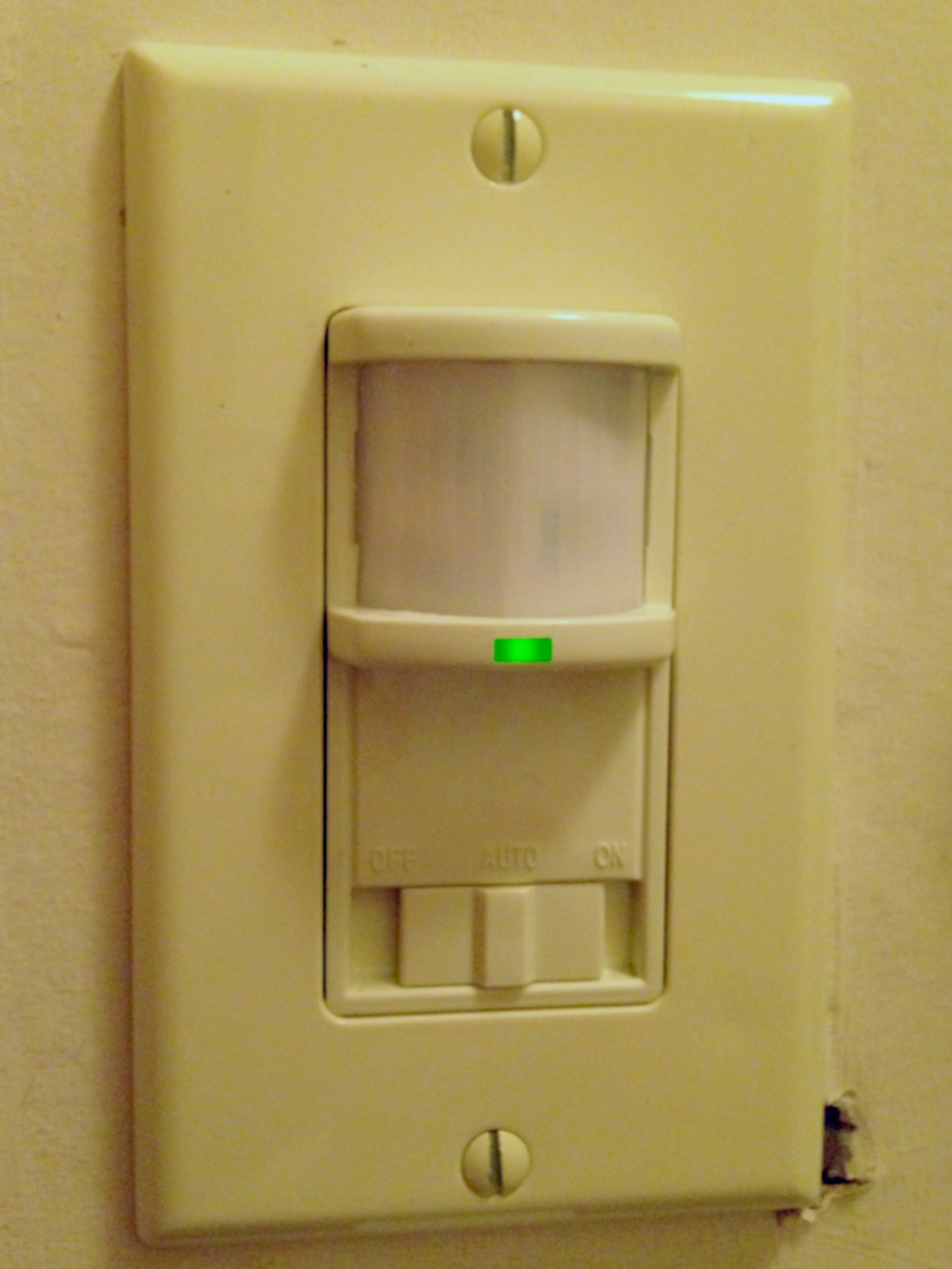
Combined PIR sensor and lightswitch

PIR sensors may be used to control lighting in such areas. They avoid the need to press a push-button but otherwise operate as for electronic timers. As PIR sensors are not perfectly reliable a timer is needed to avoid the lights flashing off and on as the occupier moves out of detector range. The timer interval is short though compared to a push-button timer; it times the interval between sightings of the occupier, not the time of occupancy.

Such sensors are also used for restrooms. Owing to the variability of occupancy time in a restroom, a simple fixed timer was unworkable. This ability to cope with variably occupancy times is also useful when stairwells, lift lobbies and corridors must grant disabled access as they no longer discriminate in favour of an assumed transit time for an able-bodied person.

== See also ==
- Twilight switch
