= Key switch =

Key-operated switch

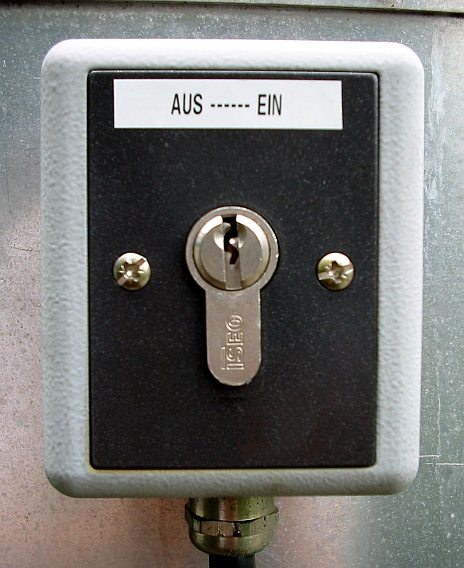
- On/off key switch
- Working principle: Switch

Electronic symbol

A key switch (sometimes called a keyswitch or lock switch) is a key-operated switch. Key switches are used in situations where access to the switch's functions needs to be restricted.

Key switches are available as components with solder connections, and are available with a variety of ampere ratings. They may use tubular or other specially-shaped keys for extra security.

Key switches have been used for a variety of purposes, up to and including the launch of nuclear missiles.

In less secure applications such as corridor and restroom lighting controls in public buildings, tamper-resistant switches with a simpler key mechanism may be used instead.
