= Polymer characterization =

Polymer characterization is the analytical branch of polymer science.

The discipline is concerned with the characterization of polymeric materials on a variety of levels. The characterization typically has as a goal to improve the performance of the material. As such, many characterization techniques should ideally be linked to the desirable properties of the material such as strength, impermeability, thermal stability, and optical properties.

Characterization techniques are typically used to determine molecular mass, molecular structure, molecular morphology, thermal properties, and mechanical properties.

== Molecular mass ==
The molecular mass of a polymer differs from typical molecules, in that polymerization reactions produce a distribution of molecular weights and shapes. The distribution of molecular masses can be summarized by the number-average molecular weight, weight-average molecular weight, and polydispersity. Some of the most common methods for determining these parameters are colligative property measurements, static light scattering techniques, viscometry, and size exclusion chromatography.

Gel permeation chromatography, a type of size exclusion chromatography, is an especially useful technique used to directly determine the molecular weight distribution parameters based on the polymer's hydrodynamic volume. Gel permeation chromatography is often used in combination with multi-angle light scattering (MALS), Low-angle laser light scattering (LALLS) and/or viscometry for an absolute determination (i.e., independent of the chromatographic separation details) of the molecular weight distribution as well as the branching ratio and degree of long chain branching of a polymer, provided a suitable solvent can be found.

Molar mass determination of copolymers is a much more complicated procedure. The complications arise from the effect of solvent on the homopolymers and how this can affect the copolymer morphology. Analysis of copolymers typically requires multiple characterization methods. For instance, copolymers with short chain branching such as linear low-density polyethylene (a copolymer of ethylene and a higher alkene such as hexene or octene) require the use of Analytical Temperature Rising Elution Fractionation (ATREF) techniques. These techniques can reveal how the short chain branches are distributed over the various molecular weights. A more efficient analysis of copolymer molecular mass and composition is possible using GPC combined with a triple-detection system comprising multi-angle light scattering, UV absorption and differential refractometry, if the copolymer is composed of two base polymers that provide different responses to UV and/or refractive index.

== Molecular structure ==
Many of the analytical techniques used to determine the molecular structure of unknown organic compounds are also used in polymer characterization. Spectroscopic techniques such as ultraviolet-visible spectroscopy, infrared spectroscopy, Raman spectroscopy, nuclear magnetic resonance spectroscopy, electron spin resonance spectroscopy, X-ray diffraction, and mass spectrometry are used to identify common functional groups.

== Morphology ==
Polymer morphology is a microscale property that is largely dictated by the amorphous or crystalline portions of the polymer chains and their influence on each other. Microscopy techniques are especially useful in determining these microscale properties, as the domains created by the polymer morphology are large enough to be viewed using modern microscopy instruments. Some of the most common microscopy techniques used are X-ray diffraction, transmission electron microscopy, scanning transmission electron microscopy, scanning electron microscopy, and atomic force microscopy.

Polymer morphology on a mesoscale (nanometers to micrometers) is particularly important for the mechanical properties of many materials. Transmission electron microscopy in combination with staining techniques, but also scanning electron microscopy, scanning probe microscopy are important tools to optimize the morphology of materials like polybutadiene-polystyrene polymers and many polymer blends.

X-ray diffraction is generally not as powerful for this class of materials as they are either amorphous or poorly crystallized. The small-angle scattering like small-angle X-ray scattering (SAXS) can be used to measure the long periods of semicrystalline polymers.

== Thermal properties ==
A true workhorse for polymer characterization is thermal analysis, particularly differential scanning calorimetry. Changes in the compositional and structural parameters of the material usually affect its melting transitions or glass transitions and these in turn can be linked to many performance parameters. For semicrystalline polymers it is an important method to measure crystallinity. Thermogravimetric analysis can also give an indication of polymer thermal stability and the effects of additives such as flame retardants. Other thermal analysis techniques are typically combinations of the basic techniques and include differential thermal analysis, thermomechanical analysis, dynamic mechanical thermal analysis, and dielectric thermal analysis.

Dynamic mechanical spectroscopy and dielectric spectroscopy are essentially extensions of thermal analysis that can reveal more subtle transitions with temperature as they affect the complex modulus or the dielectric function of the material.

== Mechanical properties ==
The characterization of mechanical properties in polymers typically refers to a measure of the strength, elasticity, viscoelasticity, and anisotropy of a polymeric material. The mechanical properties of a polymer are strongly dependent upon the Van der Waals interactions of the polymer chains, and the ability of the chains to elongate and align in the direction of the applied force. Other phenomena, such as the propensity of polymers to form crazes can impact the mechanical properties. Typically, polymeric materials are characterized as elastomers, plastics, or rigid polymers depending on their mechanical properties.

The tensile strength, yield strength, and Young's modulus are measures of strength and elasticity, and are of particular interest for describing the stress-strain properties of polymeric materials. These properties can be measured through tensile testing. For crystalline or semicrystalline polymers, anisotropy plays a large role in the mechanical properties of the polymer. The crystallinity of the polymer can be measured through differential scanning calorimetry. For amorphous and semicrystalline polymers, as stress is applied, the polymer chains are able to disentangle and align. If the stress is applied in the direction of chain alignment, the polymer chains will exhibit a higher yield stress and strength, as the covalent bonds connecting the backbone of the polymer absorb the stress. However, if the stress is applied normal to the direction of chain alignment, the Van der Waals interactions between chains will primarily be responsible for the mechanical properties and thus, the yield stress will decrease. This would be observable in a stress strain graph found through tensile testing. Sample preparation, including chain orientation within the sample, for tensile tests therefore can play a large role in the observed mechanical properties.

The fracture properties of crystalline and semicrystalline polymers can be evaluated with Charpy impact testing. Charpy tests, which can also be used with alloy systems, are performed by creating a notch in the sample, and then using a pendulum to fracture the sample at the notch. The pendulum’s motion can be used to extrapolate the energy absorbed by the sample to fracture it. Charpy tests can also be used to evaluate the strain rate on the fracture, as measured with changes in the pendulum mass. Typically, only brittle and somewhat ductile polymers are evaluated with Charpy tests. In addition to the fracture energy, the type of break can be visually evaluated, as in whether the break was a total fracture of the sample or whether the sample experienced fracture in only part of the sample, and severely deformed section are still connected. Elastomers are typically not evaluated with Charpy tests due to their high yield strain inhibiting the Charpy test results.

There are many properties of polymeric materials that influence their mechanical properties. As the degree of polymerization goes up, so does the polymer’s strength, as a longer chains have high Van der Waals interactions and chain entanglement. Long polymers can entangle, which leads to a subsequent increase in bulk modulus. Crazes are small cracks that form in a polymer matrix, but which are stopped by small defects in the polymer matrix. These defects are typically made up of a second, low modulus polymer that is dispersed throughout the primary phase. The crazes can increase the strength and decrease the brittleness of a polymer by allowing the small cracks to absorb higher stress and strain without leading to fracture. If crazes are allowed to propagate or coalesce, they can lead to cavitation and fracture in the sample. Crazes can be seen with transmission electron microscopy and scanning electron microscopy, and are typically engineered into a polymeric material during synthesis. Crosslinking, typically seen in thermoset polymers, can also increase the modulus, yield stress, and yield strength of a polymer.

Dynamic mechanical analysis is the most common technique used to characterize viscoelastic behavior common in many polymeric systems. DMA is also another important tool to understand the temperature dependence of polymers’ mechanical behavior. Dynamic mechanical analysis is a characterization technique used to measure storage modulus and glass transition temperature, confirm crosslinking, determine switching temperatures in shape-memory polymers, monitor cures in thermosets, and determine molecular weight. An oscillating force is applied to a polymer sample and the sample’s response is recorded. DMA documents the lag between force applied and deformation recovery in the sample. Viscoelastic samples exhibit a sinusoidal modulus called the dynamic modulus. Both energy recovered and lost are considered during each deformation and described quantitatively by the elastic modulus (E’) and the loss modulus (E’’) respectively. The applied stress and the strain on the sample exhibit a phase difference, ẟ, which is measured over time. A new modulus is calculated each time stress is applied to the material, so DMA is used to study changes in modulus at various temperatures or stress frequencies.

Other techniques include viscometry, rheometry, and pendulum hardness.

== Other techniques ==
- Field flow fractionation
- laser assisted mass analysis
- ACOMP
- MFI
- Dual polarisation interferometry
- Matrix-assisted laser desorption/ionization
