= Evolved gas analysis =

Evolved gas analysis (EGA) is a method used to study the gas evolved from a heated sample that undergoes decomposition or desorption. It is either possible just to detect evolved gases using evolved gas detection (EGD) or to analyse explicitly which gases evolved using evolved gas analysis (EGA). Therefore different analytical methods can be employed such as mass spectrometry, Fourier transform spectroscopy, gas chromatography, or optical in-situ evolved gas analysis.

By coupling the thermal analysis instrument, e. g. TGA (thermogravimetry) or DSC (differential scanning calorimetry), with a fast Quadrupole Mass Spectrometer (QMS) the detection of gas separation and identification of the separated components are possible in exact time correlation with the other thermal analysis signals. DSC/TGA-QMS or TGA-QMS yields information on the composition (mass numbers of elements and molecules) of the evolved gases. It allows fast and easy interpretation of atomic/inorganic vapors and standard gases like H_{2}, H_{2}O, CO_{2}, etc. Fragmentation, interpretation of organic molecules is sometimes difficult.

The combination with an FTIR (Fourier transform infrared spectrometer) has become popular, especially in the polymer producing, chemical and pharmaceutical industry. DSC/TGA-FTIR or TGA-FTIR yields information on the composition (absorption bands) of the evolved gases (bonding conditions). The advantage is an easy interpretation (spectra data bases) of organic vapors without fragmentation. Symmetrical molecules can not be detected.

An EGA instrument named the Thermal and Evolved-Gas Analyzer was flown on the Phoenix Lander probe that reached Mars in May 2008. Its purpose was to study Martian soil samples.

An EGA instrument was contained within the Sample Analysis at Mars (SAM) instrument suite onboard Curiosity Rover which landed on Mars in 2012. The instrument's goal was to understand the habitability and past climates of Mars. SAM detected complex organic carbon on the surface of Mars at Gale Crater in a 3.5 billion year old mudstone.

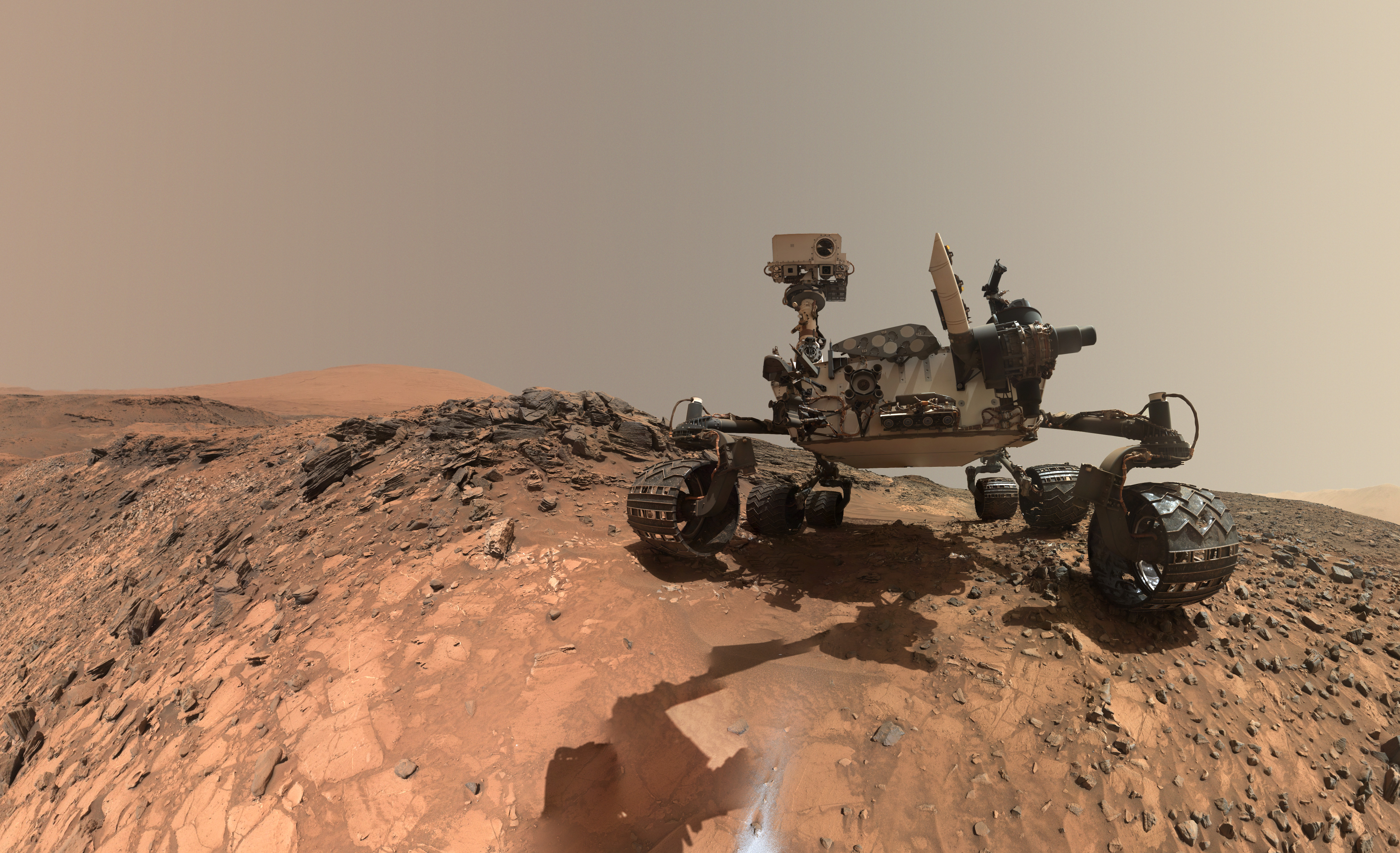
Sol 1065, August 5, 2015. NASA's Curiosity Mars rover at the site from which it reached down to drill into a rock target called "Buckskin" on lower Mount Sharp, Gale Crater, Mars
