= Curing (chemistry) =

Chemical process by which polymeric materials are hardened

Curing is a chemical process employed in polymer chemistry and process engineering that produces the toughening or hardening of a polymer material by cross-linking of polymer chains. Even if it is strongly associated with the production of thermosetting polymers, the term "curing" can be used for all the processes where a solid product is obtained from a liquid solution, such as with PVC plastisols.

== Curing process ==
Figure 1: Structure of a cured epoxy glue. The triamine hardener is shown in red, the resin in black. The resin's epoxide groups have reacted with the hardener. The material is highly crosslinked and contains many OH groups, which confer adhesive properties.

During the curing process, single monomers and oligomers, mixed with or without a curing agent, react to form a tridimensional polymeric network.

In the very first part of the reaction branches of molecules with various architectures are formed, and their molecular weight increases in time with the extent of the reaction until the network size is equal to the size of the system. The system has lost its solubility and its viscosity tends to infinite. The remaining molecules start to coexist with the macroscopic network until they react with the network creating other crosslinks. The crosslink density increases until the system reaches the end of the chemical reaction.

Curing can be induced by heat, radiation, electron beams, or chemical additives. To quote from IUPAC: curing "might or might not require mixing with a chemical curing agent". Thus, two broad classes are curing induced by chemical additives (also called curing agents, hardeners) and curing in the absence of additives. An intermediate case involves a mixture of resin and additives that requires external stimulus (light, heat, radiation) to induce curing.

The curing methodology depends on the resin and the application. Particular attention is paid to the shrinkage induced by the curing. Usually small values of shrinkage (2–3%) are desirable.

== Curing induced by additives ==
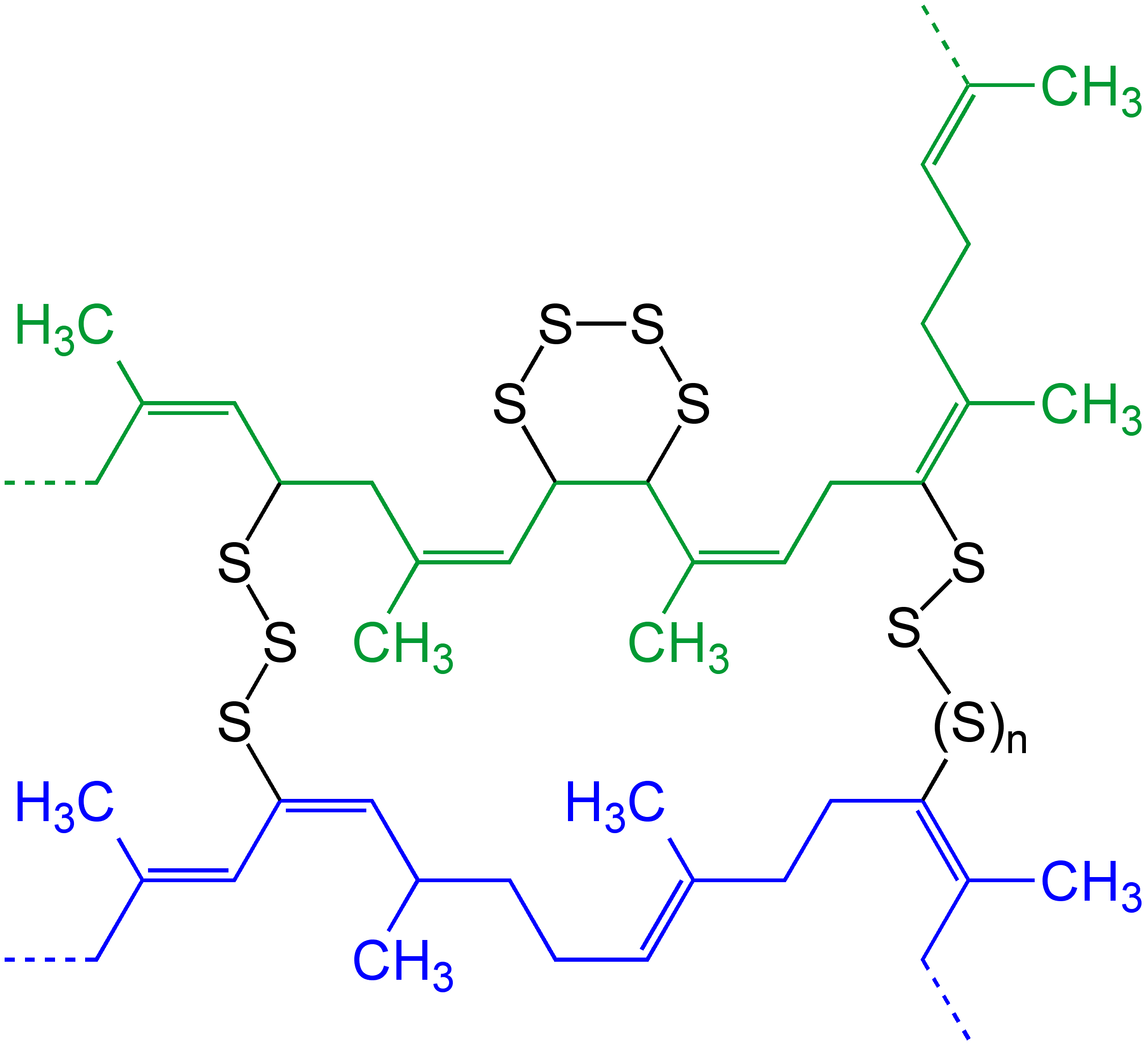
Figure 2: General representation of the chemical structure of vulcanized natural rubber showing the crosslinking of two polymer chains (blue and green) with sulfur (n = 0, 1, 2, 3 ...).

Figure 3: Simplified chemical reactions associated with curing of a drying oil. In the first step, the diene undergoes autoxidation to give a hydroperoxide. In the second step, the hydroperoxide combines with another unsaturated side chain to generate a crosslink.

Epoxy resins are typically cured by the use of additives, often called hardeners. Polyamines are often used. The amine groups ring-open the epoxide rings.

In rubber, the curing is also induced by the addition of a crosslinker. The resulting process is called sulfur vulcanization. Sulfur breaks down to form polysulfide cross-links (bridges) between sections of the polymer chains. The degree of crosslinking determines the rigidity and durability, as well as other properties of the material.

Paints and varnishes commonly contain oil drying agents, usually metallic soaps that catalyze cross-linking of the unsaturated drying oils that largely comprise them. When paint is described as "drying" it is in fact hardening by crosslinking. Oxygen atoms serve as the crosslinks, analogous to the role played by sulfur in the vulcanization of rubber.

== Curing without additives ==
In the case of concrete, curing entails the formation of silicate crosslinks. The process is not induced by additives.

In many cases, the resin is provided as a solution or mixture with a thermally-activated catalyst, which induces crosslinking but only upon heating. For example, some acrylate-based resins are formulated with dibenzoyl peroxide. Upon heating the mixture, the peroxide converts to a free radical, which adds to an acrylate, initiating crosslinking.

Some organic resins are cured with heat. As heat is applied, the viscosity of the resin drops before the onset of crosslinking, whereupon it increases as the constituent oligomers interconnect. This process continues until a tridimensional network of oligomer chains is created – this stage is termed gelation. In terms of processability of the resin this marks an important stage: before gelation the system is relatively mobile, after it the mobility is very limited, the micro-structure of the resin and the composite material is fixed and severe diffusion limitations to further cure are created. Thus, in order to achieve vitrification in the resin, it is usually necessary to increase the process temperature after gelation.

When catalysts are activated by ultraviolet radiation, the process is called UV cure.

== Monitoring methods ==
Cure monitoring is, for example, an essential component for the control of the manufacturing process of composite materials. The material, initially liquid, at the end of the process will be solid: viscosity is the most important property that changes during the process.

Cure monitoring relies on monitoring various physical or chemical properties.

=== Rheological analysis ===
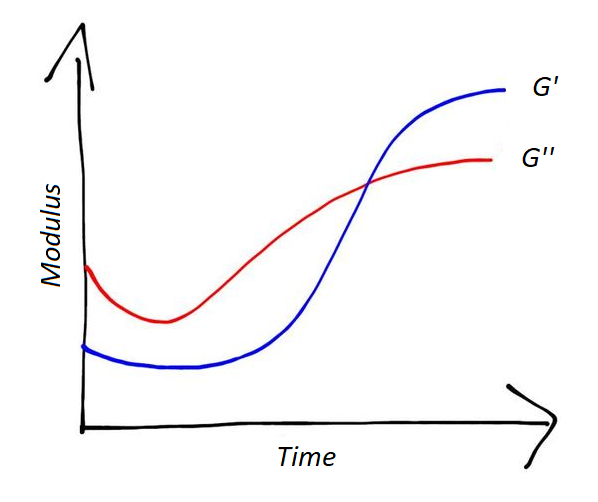
Figure 4: Evolution in time of storage modulus G′ and loss modulus G″ during a curing reaction.

A simple way to monitor the change in viscosity, and thus, the extent of the reaction, in a curing process is to measure the variation of the elastic modulus.

To measure the elastic modulus of a system during curing, a rheometer can be used. With dynamic mechanical analysis, the storage modulus (G′) and the loss modulus (G″) can be measured. The variation of G′ and G″ in time can indicate the extent of the curing reaction.

As shown in Figure 4, after an "induction time", G′ and G″ start to increase, with an abrupt change in slope. At a certain point they cross each other; afterwards, the rates of G′ and G″ decrease, and the moduli tend to a plateau. When they reach the plateau the reaction is concluded.

When the system is liquid, the storage modulus is very low: the system behaves like a liquid. Then the reaction continues and the system starts to react more like a solid: the storage modulus increases.

The degree of curing, $\alpha$, can be defined as follow:

$\alpha = \frac {G'(t) - G'_{min}} {G'_{max} - G'_{min}}$

The degree of curing starts from zero (at the beginning of the reaction) and grows until one (the end of the reaction). The slope of the curve changes with time and has his maximum about at half of the reaction.

=== Thermal analysis ===
If the reactions occurring during crosslinking are exothermic, the crosslinking rate can be related to the heat released during the process. The higher the number of bonds created, the higher is the heat released in the reaction. At the end of the reaction, no more heat will be released. To measure the heat flow differential scanning calorimetry can be used.

Assuming that each bond formed during the crosslinking releases the same amount of energy, the degree of curing, $\alpha$, can be defined as follows:

$\alpha = \frac {Q} {Q_T} = \frac {\int_{0}^{s} \dot Q\, dt} {\int_{0}^{s_f} \dot Q\, dt}$

where $Q$ is the heat released up to a certain time $s$, $\dot Q$ is the instantaneous rate of heat and $Q_T$ is the total amount of heat released in $s_f$, when the reaction finishes.

Also in this case the degree of curing goes from zero (no bonds created) to one (no more reactions occur) with a slope that changes in time and has its maximum about at half of the reaction.

=== Dielectrometric analysis ===
Conventional dielectrometry is carried out typically in a parallel plate configuration of the dielectric sensor (capacitance probe) and has the capability of monitoring the resin cure throughout the entire cycle, from the liquid to the rubber to the solid state. It is capable of monitoring phase separation in complex resin blends curing also within a fibrous perform. The same attributes belong to the more recent development of the dielectric technique, namely microdielectrometry.

Several versions of dielectric sensors are available commercially. The most suitable format for use in cure monitoring applications are the flat interdigital capacitive structures bearing a sensing grid on their surface. Depending on their design (specifically those on durable substrates) they have some reusability, while flexible substrate sensors can be used also in the bulk of the resin systems as embedded sensors.

=== Spectroscopic analysis ===
The curing process can be monitored by measuring changes in various parameters:

- the concentration of specific reactive resin species using spectroscopic methods such as FTIR & Raman;
- the refractive index or fluorescence of the resin (optical property);
- the internal resin strain (mechanical property) with the use of Fiber Bragg grating (FBG) sensors.

=== Ultrasonic analysis ===
Ultrasonic cure monitoring methods are based on the relationships between changes in the characteristics of propagating ultrasound and the real-time mechanical properties of a component, by measuring:

- ultrasonic time of flight, both in through-transmission and pulse-echo modes;
- natural frequency using impact excitation and laser-induced surface acoustic wave velocity measurement.

== See also ==
- Vulcanization
- Cross-link
