= OIT =

OIT may refer to:

== Science and technology ==
=== Computing ===
- Operator Interface Terminal, in industrial design (see user interface)
- Order-independent transparency, in computer graphics

=== Medicine ===
- Oral immunotherapy, oral feeding of allergen to raise allergic threshold

=== Other uses in science and technology ===
- Out of India Theory, the idea that the Aryans are indigenous to the Indian subcontinent
- Oxidative-induction time, a standardized test which measures the level of thermal stabilization

== Places ==
- Oita Airport, Kunisaki, Oita Prefecture, Japan (by IATA airport code)

== Education ==
- Osaka Institute of Technology, Osaka, Japan
- Oregon Institute of Technology, Oregon, United States
- Oriental Institute of Technology, a university in New Taipei, Taiwan
