= Thermomechanical analysis =

Thermomechanical Analysis
- Acronym: TMA
- Classification: Thermal analysis

Other techniques
- Related: Dynamic mechanical analysis Thermomechanical analysis Thermogravimetric analysis Differential thermal analysis Dielectric thermal analysis

Thermomechanical analysis (TMA) is a technique used in thermal analysis, a branch of materials science which studies the properties of materials as they change with temperature.

Thermomechanical analysis is a subdiscipline of the thermomechanometry (TM) technique.

== Related techniques and terminology ==
Thermomechanometry is the measurement of a change of a dimension or a mechanical property of the sample while it is subjected to a temperature regime. An associated thermoanalytical method is thermomechanical analysis. A special related technique is thermodilatometry (TD), the measurement of a change of a dimension of the sample with a negligible force acting on the sample while it is subjected to a temperature regime. The associated thermoanalytical method is thermodilatometric analysis (TDA).

TDA is often referred to as zero force TMA. The temperature regime may be heating, cooling at a rate of temperature change that can include stepwise temperature changes, linear rate of change, temperature modulation with a set frequency and amplitude, free (uncontrolled) heating or cooling, or maintaining a constant increase in temperature. The sequence of temperatures with respect to time may be predetermined (temperature programmed) or sample controlled (controlled by a feedback signal from the sample response).

Thermomechanometry includes several variations according to the force and the way the force is applied.

Static force TM (sf-TM) is when the applied force is constant; previously called TMA with TD as the special case of zero force.

Dynamic force TM (df-TM) is when the force is changed as for the case of a typical stress–strain analysis; previously called TMA with the term dynamic meaning any alteration of the variable with time, and not to be confused with dynamic mechanical analysis (DMA).

Modulated force TM (mf-TM) is when the force is changed with a frequency and amplitude; previously called DMA. The term modulated is a special variant of dynamic, used to be consistent with modulated temperature differential scanning calorimetry (mt-DSC) and other situations when a variable is imposed in a cyclic manner.

== Mechanical test ==
Mechanical testing seeks to measure mechanical properties of materials using various test specimen and fixture geometries using a range of probe types.

Measurement is desired to take place with minimal disturbance of the material being measured. Some characteristics of a material can be measured without disturbance, such as dimensions, mass, volume, density. However, measurement of mechanical properties normally involves disturbance of the system being measured.

The measurement often reflects the combined material and measuring device as the system. Knowledge of a structure can be gained by imposing an external stimulus and measuring the response of the material with a suitable probe. The external stimulus can be a stress or strain, however in thermal analysis the influence is often temperature.

Thermomechanometry is where a stress is applied to a material and the resulting strain is measured while the material is subjected to a controlled temperature program. The simplest mode of TM is where the imposed stress is zero. No mechanical stimulus is imposed upon the material, the material response is generated by a thermal stress, either by heating or cooling.

=== Zero force thermomechanometry ===
Zero force TM (a variant of sf-TM or TD) measures the response of the material to changes in temperature and the basic change is due to activation of atomic or molecular phonons. Increased thermal vibrations produce thermal expansion characterized by the coefficient of thermal expansion (CTE) that is the gradient of the graph of dimensional change versus temperature.

CTE depends upon thermal transitions such as the glass transition. CTE of the glassy state is low, while at the glass transition temperature (Tg) increased degrees of molecular segmental motion are released so CTE of the rubbery state is high. Changes in an amorphous polymer may involve other sub-Tg thermal transitions associated with short molecular segments, side-chains and branches. The linearity of the sf-TM curve will be changed by such transitions.

Other relaxations may be due to release of internal stress arising from the non-equilibrium state of the glassy amorphous polymer. Such stress is referred to as thermal aging. Other stresses may be as a result of moulding pressures, extrusion orientation, thermal gradients during solidification and externally imparted stresses.

==== Semi-crystalline polymers ====
Semi-crystalline polymers are more complex than amorphous polymers, since the crystalline regions are interspersed with amorphous regions. Amorphous regions in close association to the crystals or contain common molecules as tie molecules have less degrees of freedom than the bulk amorphous phase. These immobilised amorphous regions are called the rigid amorphous phase. CTE of the rigid amorphous phase is expected to be lower than that of the bulk amorphous phase.

The crystallite are typically not at equilibrium and they may contain different polymorphs. The crystals re-organize during heating so that they approach the equilibrium crystalline state. Crystal re-organization is a thermally activated process. Further crystallization of the amorphous phase may take place. Each of these processes will interfere with thermal expansion of the material.

The material may be a blend or a two-phase block or graft copolymer. If both phases are amorphous then two Tg will be observed if the material exists as two phases. If one Tg is exhibited then it will be between the Tg of the components and the resultant Tg will likely be described by a relationship such as the Flory–Fox or Kwei equations.

If one of the components is semi-crystalline then the complexity of a pure crystalline phase and either one or two amorphous phases will result. If both components are semi-crystalline then the morphology will be complex since both crystal phases will likely form separately, though with influence on each other.

==== Cross-linking ====
Cross-linking will restrict the molecular response to temperature change since degree of freedom for segmental motions are reduced as molecules become irreversibly linked. Cross-linking chemically links molecules, while crystallinity and fillers introduce physical constraints to motion. Mechanical properties such as derived from stress-strain testing are used to calculate crosslink density that is usually expressed as the molar mass between crosslinks (Mc).

The sensitivity of zero stress TMA to crosslinking is low since the structure receives minimum disturbance. Sensitivity to crosslinks requires high strain such that the segments between crosslinks become fully extended.

Zero force TM will only be sensitive to changes in the bulk that are expressed as a change in a linear dimension of the material. The measured change will be the resultant of all processes occurring as the temperature is changed. Some of the processes will be reversible, others irreversible, and others time-dependent. The methodology must be chosen to best detect, distinguish and resolve the thermal expansion or contractions observable.

The TM instrument need only apply sufficient stress to keep the probe in contact with the specimen surface, but it must have high sensitivity to dimensional change. The experiment must be conducted at a temperature change rate slow enough for the material to approach thermal equilibrium throughout. While the temperature should be the same throughout the material it will not necessarily be at thermal equilibrium in the context of molecular relaxations.

The temperature of the molecules relative to equilibrium is expressed as the fictive temperature. The fictive temperature is the temperature at which the unrelaxed molecules would be at equilibrium.

== Zero-stress thermomechanometry experimental ==
TM is sufficient for zero stress experiments since superimposition of a frequency to create a dynamic mechanical experiment will have no effect since there is no stress other than a nominal contact stress. The material can be best characterized by an experiment in which the original material is first heated to the upper temperature required, then the material should be cooled at the same rate, followed by a second heating scan.

The first heating scan provides a measure of the material with all of its structural complexities. The cooling scan allows and measures the material as the molecules lose mobility, so it is going from an equilibrium state and gradually moving away from equilibrium as the cooling rate exceeds the relaxation rate. The second heating scan will differ from the first heating scan because of thermal relaxation during the first scan and the equilibration achieved during the cooling scan. A second cooling scan followed by a third heating scan can be performed to check on the reliability of the prior scans. Different heating and cooling rates can be used to produce different equilibrations. Annealing at specific temperatures can be used to provide different isothermal relaxations that can be measured by a subsequent heating scan.

=== Static-force TM ===
The sf-TM experiments duplicate experiments that can be performed using differential scanning calorimetry (DSC). A limitation of DSC is that the heat exchange during a process or due to the heat capacity of the material cannot be measured over long times or at slow heating or cooling rates since the finite quantity of heat exchanges will be dispersed over too long a time to be detected. The limitation does not apply to sf-TM since the dimensional change of the material can be measured over any time. The constraint is the practical time for the experiment. The application of multiple scans is shown above to distinguish reversible from irreversible changes. Thermal cycling and annealing steps can be added to provide complex thermal programs to test various attributes of a material as more becomes known about the material.

=== Modulated-temperature TM ===
Modulated temperature TM (mt-TM) has been used as an analogous experiment to modulated-temperature DSC (mtDSC). The principle of mt-TM is similar to the DSC analogy. The temperature is modulated as the TM experiment proceeds. Some thermal processes are reversible, such as the true CTE, while others such as stress relief, orientation randomization and crystallization are irreversible within the conditions of the experiment. The modulation conditions should be different from mt-DSC since the sample and test fixture and enclosure is larger thus requiring longer equilibration time. mt-DSC typically uses a period of 60 s, amplitude 0.5-1.0 °C and average heating or cooling rate of 2 °C·min-1. MT-TMA may have a period of 1000 s with the other parameters similar to mt-DSC. These conditions will require long scan times.

Another experiment is an isothermal equilibration where the material is heated rapidly to a temperature where relaxations can proceed more rapidly. Thermal aging can take several hours or more under ideal conditions. Internal stresses may relax rapidly. TM can be used to measure the relaxation rates and hence characteristic times for these events, provides they are within practical measurements times available for the instrument. Temperature is the variable that can be changed to bring relaxations into measurable time ranges.

== Static force thermomechanometry experimental ==
Creep and stress relaxation measures the elasticity, viscoelasticity and viscous behaviour of materials under a selected stress and temperature. Tensile geometry is the most common for creep measurements. A small force is initially imparted to keep the specimen aligned and straight. The selected stress is applied rapidly and held constant for the required time; this may be 1 h or more. During application of force the elastic property is observed as an immediate elongation or strain. During the constant force period the time dependent elastic response or viscoelasticity, together with the viscous response, result in further increase in strain.

The force is removed rapidly, though the small alignment force is maintained. The recovery measurement time should be four times the creep time, so in this example the recovery time should be 4 h. Upon removal of the force the elastic component results in an immediate contraction. The viscoelastic recovery is exponential as the material slowly recovers some of the previously imparted creep strain. After recovery there is a permanent unrecovered strain due to the viscous component of the properties.

Analysis of the data is performed using the four component viscoelastic model where the elements are represented by combinations of springs and dashpots. The experiment can be repeated using different creep forces. The results for varying forces after the same creep time can be used to construct isochronal stress–strain curves. The creep and recovery experiment can be repeated under different temperatures. The creep–time curves measured at various temperatures can be extended using the time-temperature-superposition principle to construct a creep and recovery mastercurve that extends the data to very long and very short times. These times would be impractical to measure directly. Creep at very long timeframes is important for prediction of long term properties and product lifetimes. A complementary property is stress relaxation, where a strain is applied and the corresponding stress change is measured. The mode of measurement is not directly available with most thermomechanical instruments. Stress relaxation is available using any standard universal test instruments, since their mode of operation is application of strain, while the stress is measured.

== Dynamic force thermomechanometry experimental ==
Experiments where the force is changed with time are called dynamic force thermomechanometry (df-TM). This use of the term dynamic is distinct from the situation where the force is periodically changed with time, typically following a sine relationship, where the term modulated is recommended. Most thermomechanical instruments are force controlled, that is they apply a force, then measure a resulting change in a dimension of the test specimen. Usually a constant strain rate is used for stress–strain measurements, but in the case of df-TM the stress will be applied at a chosen rate.

The result of a stress-strain analysis is a curve that will reveal the modulus (hardness) or compliance (softness, the reciprocal of modulus). The modulus is the slope of the initial linear region of the stress–strain curve. Various ways of selecting the region to calculate gradient are used such as the initial part of the curve, another is to select a region defined by the secant to the curve. If the test material is a thermoplastic a yield zone may be observed and a yield stress (strength) calculated. A brittle material will break before it yields. A ductile material will further deform after yielding. When the material breaks a break stress (ultimate stress) and break strain are calculated. The area under the stress–strain curve is the energy required to break (toughness).

Thermomechanical instruments are distinct in that they can measure only small changes in linear dimension (typically 1 to 10 mm) so it is possible to measure yield and break properties for small specimens and those that do not change dimensions very much before exhibiting these properties.

A purpose of measuring a stress–strain curve is to establish the linear viscoelastic region (LVR). LVR is this initial linear part of a stress–strain curve where an increase in stress is accompanied by a proportional increase in strain, that is the modulus is constant and the change in dimension is reversible. A knowledge of LVR is a prerequisite for any modulated force thermomechanometry experiments. Conduct of complex experiments should be preceded by preliminary experiments with a limited range of variables to establish the behaviour of the test material for selection of further instrument configuration and operating parameters.

== Modulated temperature thermomechanometry experimental ==
Modulated temperature conditions are where the temperature is changed in a cyclic manner such as in a sine, isothermal-heating, isothermal-cooling or heat-cool. The underlying temperature can increase, decrease or be constant. Modulated temperature conditions enable separation of the data into reversing data that is in-phase with the temperature changes, and non-reversing that is out-of-phase with the temperature changes. Sf-TM is required since the force should be constant while the temperature is modulated, or at least constant for each modulation period.

A reversing properties is coefficient of thermal expansion. Non-reversing properties are thermal relaxations, stress relief and morphological changes that occur during heating, causing the material to approach thermal equilibrium.
