= Dielectric thermal analysis =

- Acronym: DETA / DEA
- Classification: Thermal analysis

Other techniques
- Related: Isothermal titration calorimetry Dynamic mechanical analysis Thermomechanical analysis Thermogravimetric analysis Differential thermal analysis Dielectric thermal analysis

Dielectric thermal analysis (DETA), or dielectric analysis (DEA), is a materials science technique similar to dynamic mechanical analysis except that an oscillating electrical field is used instead of a mechanical force. For investigation of the curing behavior of thermosetting resin systems, composite materials, adhesives and paints, Dielectric Analysis (DEA) can be used in accordance with ASTM E 2038 or E 2039. The great advantage of DEA is that it can be employed not only on a laboratory scale, but also in process.

== Measuring principle ==
In a typical test, the sample is placed in contact with two electrodes (the dielectric sensor) and a sinusoidal voltage (the excitation) is applied to one electrode. The resulting sinusoidal current (the response) is measured at the second electrode. The response signal is attenuated in amplitude and shifted in phase in relation to the mobility of the ions and alignment of the dipoles. Dipoles in the material will attempt to align with the electric field and ions (present as impurities) will move toward the electrode of opposite polarity. The dielectric properties of permittivity ε' and loss factor ε" are then calculated from this measured amplitude and phase change.
