= Oxidative-induction time =

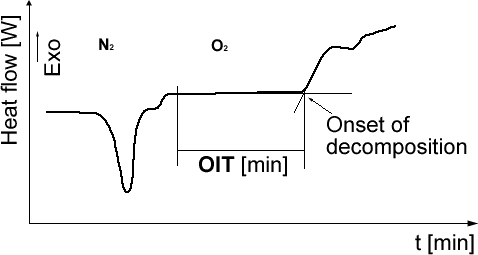
Characteristic DSC curve for a polyethylene, the OIT is measured

Oxidation induction time or OIT is a standardized test performed in a DSC which measures the level of thermal stabilization of the material tested. The time between melting and the onset of decomposition in isothermal conditions is measured. The atmosphere is nitrogen up to melting and then oxygen. The typical temperature is 190-220 °C.

Oxidation-induction time can be known with the use of Differential Scanning Calorimetry measurements, which is done with the sample body and a substance that will be heated in a constant rate in an atmosphere of inert gas. Once the specified temperature is attained, its atmosphere will be replaced by an air atmosphere of the said rate or an oxygen atmosphere. The specimen will be then held at a constant temperature up to the indication of oxidative reaction by exothermal deviation of DSC heat flow curve. Time interval in the middle of the start of the air flow and the beginning of the oxidation reaction is called the isothermal OIT. The said method was also mentioned and discussed on several various technical standards like DIN EN ISO 11357-6.

This test is routine when assessing the quality of organic materials or polymers, such as polyethylene pipes.
