= Thermal analysis =

Analysis of material by examining response to heat

Thermal analysis is a branch of materials science where the properties of materials are studied as they change with temperature. Several methods are commonly used – these are distinguished from one another by the property which is measured:

- Dielectric thermal analysis: dielectric permittivity and loss factor
- Differential thermal analysis: temperature difference versus temperature or time
- Differential scanning calorimetry: heat flow changes versus temperature or time
- Dilatometry: volume changes with temperature change
- Dynamic mechanical analysis: measures storage modulus (stiffness) and loss modulus (damping) versus temperature, time and frequency
- Evolved gas analysis: analysis of gases evolved during heating of a material, usually decomposition products
- Isothermal titration calorimetry
- Isothermal microcalorimetry
- Laser flash analysis: thermal diffusivity and thermal conductivity
- Thermogravimetric analysis: mass change versus temperature or time
- Thermomechanical analysis: dimensional changes versus temperature or time
- Thermo-optical analysis: optical properties
- Derivatography: A complex method in thermal analysis

Simultaneous thermal analysis generally refers to the simultaneous application of thermogravimetry and differential scanning calorimetry to one and the same sample in a single instrument. The test conditions are perfectly identical for the thermogravimetric analysis and differential scanning calorimetry signals (same atmosphere, gas flow rate, vapor pressure of the sample, heating rate, thermal contact to the sample crucible and sensor, radiation effect, etc.). The information gathered can even be enhanced by coupling the simultaneous thermal analysis instrument to an Evolved Gas Analyzer like Fourier transform infrared spectroscopy or mass spectrometry.

Other, less common, methods measure the sound or light emission from a sample, or the electrical discharge from a dielectric material, or the mechanical relaxation in a stressed specimen. The essence of all these techniques is that the sample's response is recorded as a function of temperature (and time).

It is usual to control the temperature in a predetermined way – either by a continuous increase or decrease in temperature at a constant rate (linear heating/cooling) or by carrying out a series of determinations at different temperatures (stepwise isothermal measurements). More advanced temperature profiles have been developed which use an oscillating (usually sine or square wave) heating rate (Modulated Temperature Thermal Analysis) or modify the heating rate in response to changes in the system's properties (Sample Controlled Thermal Analysis).In addition to controlling the temperature of the sample, it is also important to control its environment (e.g. atmosphere). Measurements may be carried out in air or under an inert gas (e.g. nitrogen or helium). Reducing or reactive atmospheres have also been used and measurements are even carried out with the sample surrounded by water or other liquids. Inverse gas chromatography is a technique which studies the interaction of gases and vapours with a surface - measurements are often made at different temperatures so that these experiments can be considered to come under the auspices of Thermal Analysis.

Atomic force microscopy uses a fine stylus to map the topography and mechanical properties of surfaces to high spatial resolution. By controlling the temperature of the heated tip and/or the sample a form of spatially resolved thermal analysis can be carried out.

Thermal analysis is also often used as a term for the study of heat transfer through structures. Many of the basic engineering data for modelling such systems comes from measurements of heat capacity and thermal conductivity.

== Polymers ==
Polymers represent another large area in which thermal analysis finds strong applications. Thermoplastic polymers are commonly found in everyday packaging and household items, but for the analysis of the raw materials, effects of the many additive used (including stabilisers and colours) and fine-tuning of the moulding or extrusion processing used can be achieved by using differential scanning calorimetry. An example is oxidation induction time by differential scanning calorimetry which can determine the amount of oxidation stabiliser present in a thermoplastic (usually a polyolefin) polymer material. Compositional analysis is often made using thermogravimetric analysis, which can separate fillers, polymer resin and other additives. Thermogravimetric analysis can also give an indication of thermal stability and the effects of additives such as flame retardants. (See J.H.Flynn, L.A.Wall J.Res.Nat.Bur. Standerds, General Treatment of the Thermogravimetry of Polymers Part A, 1966 V70A, No5 487)

Thermal analysis of composite materials, such as carbon fibre composites or glass epoxy composites are often carried out using dynamic mechanical analysis, which can measure the stiffness of materials by determining the modulus and damping (energy absorbing) properties of the material. Aerospace companies often employ these analysers in routine quality control to ensure that products being manufactured meet the required strength specifications. Formula 1 racing car manufacturers also have similar requirements. Differential scanning calorimetry is used to determine the curing properties of the resins used in composite materials, and can also confirm whether a resin can be cured and how much heat is evolved during that process. Application of predictive kinetics analysis can help to fine-tune manufacturing processes. Another example is that thermogravimetric analysis can be used to measure the fibre content of composites by heating a sample to remove the resin by application of heat and then determining the mass remaining.

== Metals ==
Production of many metals (cast iron, grey iron, ductile iron, compacted graphite iron, 3000 series aluminium alloys, copper alloys, silver, and complex steels) are aided by a production technique also referred to as thermal analysis. A sample of liquid metal is removed from the furnace or ladle and poured into a sample cup with a thermocouple embedded in it. The temperature is then monitored, and the phase diagram arrests (liquidus, eutectic, and solidus) are noted. From this information chemical composition based on the phase diagram can be calculated, or the crystalline structure of the cast sample can be estimated especially for silicon morphology in hypo-eutectic Al-Si cast alloys. Strictly speaking these measurements are cooling curves and a form of sample controlled thermal analysis whereby the cooling rate of the sample is dependent on the cup material (usually bonded sand) and sample volume which is normally a constant due to the use of standard sized sample cups. To detect phase evolution and corresponding characteristic temperatures, cooling curve and its first derivative curve should be considered simultaneously. Examination of cooling and derivative curves is done by using appropriate data analysis software. The process consists of plotting, smoothing and curve fitting as well as identifying the reaction points and characteristic parameters. This procedure is known as Computer-Aided Cooling Curve Thermal Analysis.

Advanced techniques use differential curves to locate endothermic inflection points such as gas holes, and shrinkage, or exothermic phases such as carbides, beta crystals, inter crystalline copper, magnesium silicide, iron phosphide's and other phases as they solidify. Detection limits seem to be around 0.01% to 0.03% of volume.

In addition, integration of the area between the zero curve and the first derivative is a measure of the specific heat of that part of the solidification which can lead to rough estimates of the percent volume of a phase. (Something has to be either known or assumed about the specific heat of the phase versus the overall specific heat.) In spite of this limitation, this method is better than estimates from two dimensional micro analysis, and a lot faster than chemical dissolution.

== Foods ==
Most foods undergo temperature variations during production, transport, storage, preparation, and consumption through processes like pasteurization, sterilization, evaporation, cooking, freezing, and chilling. These temperatures changes alter the physical and chemical properties of food components which affects the final product's taste, appearance, texture, and stability. Temperature variations can promote chemical reactions, such as hydrolysis, oxidation, and reduction, or trigger physical changes like evaporation, melting, crystallization, aggregation, or gelation.

A better understanding of how temperatures influences food properties allows manufacturers to optimize processing conditions and improve quality. Therefore, food scientists require reliable analytical techniques to monitor these temperature-dependent changes. Most analytical methods can be adapted for this purpose, including spectroscopy, scattering, and physical methods but thermal analysis is typically reserved for a specific suite of methods. These primarily include thermogravimetry and derivative thermogravimetry (TG/DTG), differential thermal analysis (DTA), differential scanning calorimetry (DSC), and the determination of phase transition temperatures.

== Printed circuit boards ==
Power dissipation is an important issue in present-day PCB design. Power dissipation will result in temperature difference and pose a thermal problem to a chip. In addition to the issue of reliability, excess heat will also negatively affect electrical performance and safety. The working temperature of an IC should therefore be kept below the maximum allowable limit of the worst case. In general, the temperatures of junction and ambient are 125 °C and 55 °C, respectively. The ever-shrinking chip size causes the heat to concentrate within a small area and leads to high power density. Furthermore, denser transistors gathering in a monolithic chip and higher operating frequency cause a worsening of the power dissipation. Removing the heat effectively becomes the critical issue to be resolved.

== Bibliography ==
- Paulik, F; Paulik, J; Erdey, L (1966). "Derivatography: A complex method in thermal analysis". Talanta. 13 (10): 1405–30. doi:10.1016/0039-9140(66)80083-8. PMID 18960022.
- Emadi, D.; Whiting, L. V.; Nafisi, S.; Ghomashchi, R. (2005). "Applications of thermal analysis in quality control of solidification processes". Journal of Thermal Analysis and Calorimetry. 81 (1): 235–242. doi:10.1007/s10973-005-0772-9. S2CID 96442065.
- Farahany, Saeed; Ali Ourdjini; Mohd Hasbullah Idris (2012). "The usage of computer-aided cooling curve thermal analysis to optimise eutectic refiner and modifier in Al–Si alloys". Journal of Thermal Analysis and Calorimetry. 109 (1): 105–111. doi:10.1007/s10973-011-1708-1. S2CID 138476636.
- Shabestari, S. G.; Idris, M. H.; Ourdjini, A.; Farahany, S. (November 2013). "Computer-aided cooling curve thermal analysis of near eutectic Al–Si–Cu–Fe alloy". Journal of Thermal Analysis and Calorimetry. 114 (2): 705–717. doi:10.1007/s10973-013-3005-7. S2CID 94656052.
- Ramos-Sánchez, M.C.; Rey, F.J.; Rodríguez, M.L.; Martín-Gil, F.J.; Martín-Gil, J. (1988). "DTG and DTA studies on typical sugars". Thermochimica Acta. 134: 55–60. Bibcode:1988TcAc..134...55C. doi:10.1016/0040-6031(88)85216-X.
- McClements, Julian David (August 21, 2015). Food Emulsions: Principles, Practices, and Techniques (3rd ed.). Boca Raton, FL: CRC Press. pp. 639–686. doi:10.1201/b18868. ISBN 978-1498726689. LCCN 2015024483. OCLC 910609386.
- McClements, David Julian. "Thermal Analysis of Foods".
