= Differential thermal analysis =

Thermoanalytic technique similar to differential scanning calorimetry

- Acronym: DTA
- Classification: Thermal analysis

Other techniques
- Related: Differential scanning calorimetry Isothermal microcalorimetry Dynamic mechanical analysis Thermomechanical analysis Thermogravimetric analysis Dielectric thermal analysis

Differential thermal analysis (DTA) is a thermoanalytic technique that is similar to differential scanning calorimetry. In DTA, the material under study and an inert reference are made to undergo identical thermal cycles, (i.e., same cooling or heating programme) while recording any temperature difference between sample and reference. This differential temperature is then plotted against time, or against temperature (DTA curve, or thermogram). Changes in the sample, either exothermic or endothermic, can be detected relative to the inert reference. Thus, a DTA curve provides data on the transformations that have occurred, such as glass transitions, crystallization, melting and sublimation. The area under a DTA peak is the enthalpy change and is not affected by the heat capacity of the sample.

== Apparatus ==
A DTA consists of a sample holder, thermocouples, sample containers and a ceramic or metallic block; a furnace; a temperature programmer; and a recording system. The key feature is the existence of two thermocouples connected to a voltmeter. One thermocouple is placed in an inert material such as Al_{2}O_{3}, while the other is placed in a sample of the material under study. As the temperature is increased, there will be a brief deflection of the voltmeter if the sample is undergoing a phase transition. This occurs because the input of heat will raise the temperature of the inert substance, but be incorporated as latent heat in the material changing phase. It consist of inert environment with inert gases which will not react with sample and reference. Generally helium or argon is used as inert gas.

== Today's instruments ==
In today's market most manufacturers don't make true DTA systems but rather have incorporated this technology into thermogravimetric analysis (TGA) systems, which provide both mass loss and thermal information. With today's advancements in software, even these instruments are being replaced by true TGA-DSC instruments that can provide the temperature and heat flow of the sample, simultaneously with mass loss.

== Applications ==
A DTA curve can be used only as a finger print for identification purposes but usually the applications of this method are the determination of phase diagrams, heat change measurements and decomposition in various atmospheres.

DTA is widely used in the pharmaceutical and food industries.

DTA may be used in cement chemistry, mineralogical research and in environmental studies.

DTA curves may also be used to date bone remains or to study archaeological materials. Using DTA one can obtain liquidus & solidus lines of phase diagrams.
