= Thermogravimetric analysis =

Thermal method of analysis

- Acronym: TGA
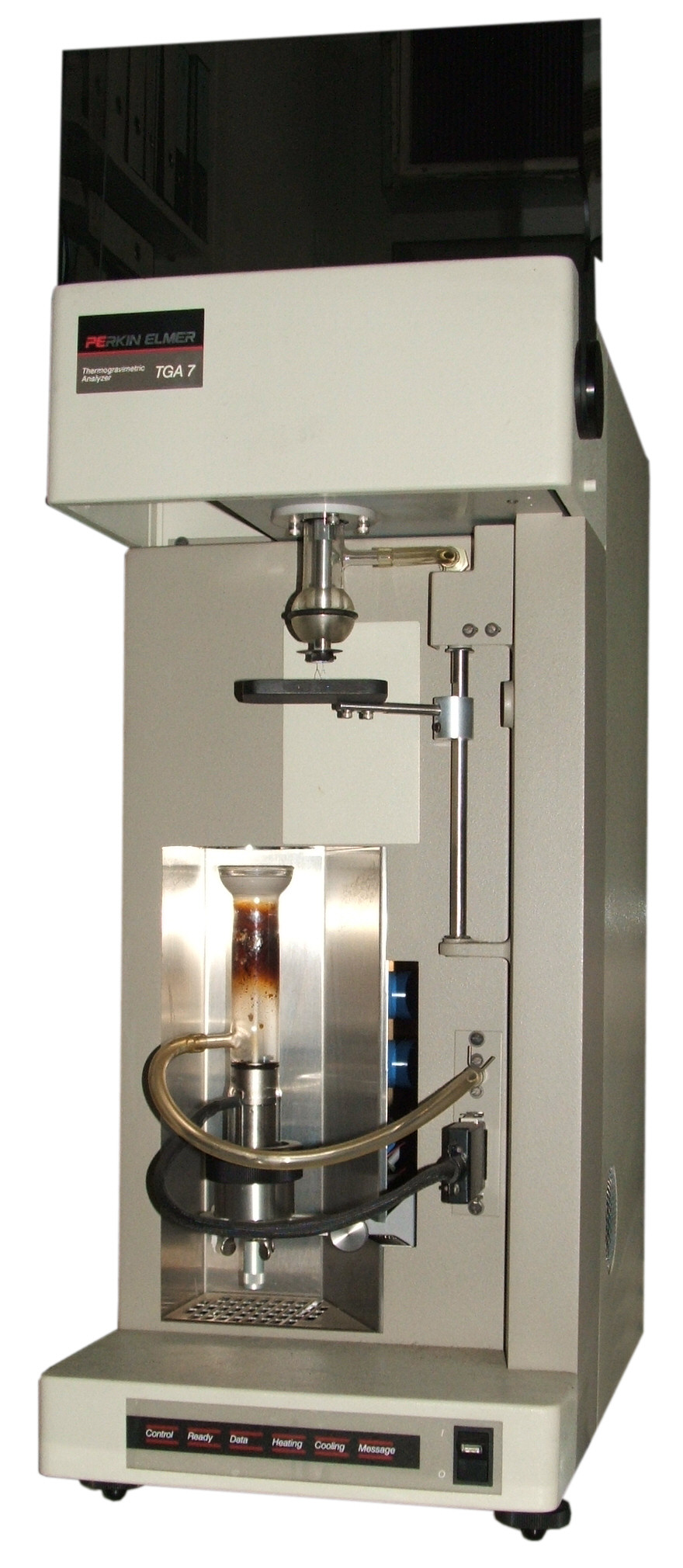
- Classification: Thermal analysis A typical TGA system

Other techniques
- Related: Isothermal microcalorimetry Differential scanning calorimetry Dynamic mechanical analysis Thermomechanical analysis Differential thermal analysis Dielectric thermal analysis

Thermogravimetric analysis or thermal gravimetric analysis (TGA) is a method of thermal analysis in which the mass of a sample is measured over time as the temperature changes. This measurement provides information about physical phenomena, such as phase transitions, absorption, adsorption and desorption; as well as chemical phenomena including chemisorptions, thermal decomposition, and solid-gas reactions (e.g., oxidation or reduction).

== Thermogravimetric analyzer ==
Thermogravimetric analysis (TGA) is conducted on an instrument referred to as a thermogravimetric analyzer. A thermogravimetric analyzer continuously measures mass while the temperature of a sample is changed over time. Mass, temperature, and time are considered base measurements in thermogravimetric analysis while many additional measures may be derived from these three base measurements.

A typical thermogravimetric analyzer consists of a precision balance with a sample pan located inside a furnace with a programmable control temperature. The temperature is generally increased at constant rate (or for some applications the temperature is controlled for a constant mass loss) to incur a thermal reaction. The thermal reaction may occur under a variety of atmospheres including: ambient air, vacuum, inert gas, oxidizing/reducing gases, corrosive gases, carburizing gases, vapors of liquids or "self-generated atmosphere"; as well as a variety of pressures including: a high vacuum, high pressure, constant pressure, or a controlled pressure.

The thermogravimetric data collected from a thermal reaction is compiled into a plot of mass or percentage of initial mass on the y axis versus either temperature or time on the x-axis. This plot, which is often smoothed, is referred to as a TGA curve. The first derivative of the TGA curve (the Differential Thermogravimetry (DTG) curve) may be plotted to determine inflection points useful for in-depth interpretations as well as differential thermal analysis.

A TGA can be used for materials characterization through analysis of characteristic decomposition patterns. It is an especially useful technique for the study of polymeric materials, including thermoplastics, thermosets, elastomers, composites, plastic films, fibers, coatings, paints, and fuels.

=== Types of TGA ===
There are three types of thermogravimetry:

- Isothermal or static thermogravimetry: In this technique, the sample weight is recorded as a function of time at a constant temperature.
- Quasistatic thermogravimetry: In this technique, the sample temperature is raised in sequential steps separated by isothermal intervals, during which the sample mass reaches stability before the start of the next temperature ramp.
- Dynamic thermogravimetry: In this technique, the sample is heated in an environment whose temperature is changed in a linear manner.

== Applications ==
=== Thermal stability ===
TGA can be used to evaluate the thermal stability of a material. In a desired temperature range, if a species is thermally stable, there will be no observed mass change. Negligible mass loss corresponds to little or no slope in the TGA trace. TGA also gives the upper use temperature of a material. Beyond this temperature the material will begin to degrade.

TGA is used in the analysis of polymers. Polymers usually melt before they decompose, thus TGA is mainly used to investigate the thermal stability of polymers. Most polymers melt or degrade before 200 °C. However, there is a class of thermally stable polymers that are able to withstand temperatures of at least 300 °C in air and 500 °C in inert gases without structural changes or strength loss, which can be analyzed by TGA.

=== Oxidation and combustion ===
The simplest materials characterization is the residue remaining after a reaction. For example, a combustion reaction could be tested by loading a sample into a thermogravimetric analyzer at normal conditions. The thermogravimetric analyzer would cause ion combustion in the sample by heating it beyond its ignition temperature. The resultant TGA curve plotted with the y-axis as a percentage of initial mass would show the residue at the final point of the curve.

Oxidative mass losses are the most common observable losses in TGA.

Studying the resistance to oxidation in copper alloys is very important. For example, NASA (National Aeronautics and Space Administration) is conducting research on advanced copper alloys for their possible use in combustion engines. However, oxidative degradation can occur in these alloys as copper oxides form in atmospheres that are rich in oxygen. Resistance to oxidation is significant because NASA wants to be able to reuse shuttle materials. TGA can be used to study the static oxidation of materials such as these for practical use.

Combustion during TG analysis is identifiable by distinct traces made in the TGA thermograms produced. One interesting example occurs with samples of as-produced unpurified carbon nanotubes that have a large amount of metal catalyst present. Due to combustion, a TGA trace can deviate from the normal form of a well-behaved function. This phenomenon arises from a rapid temperature change. When the weight and temperature are plotted versus time, a dramatic slope change in the first derivative plot is concurrent with the mass loss of the sample and the sudden increase in temperature seen by the thermocouple. The mass loss could result from particles of smoke released from burning caused by inconsistencies in the material itself, beyond the oxidation of carbon due to poorly controlled weight loss.

Different weight losses on the same sample at different points can also be used as a diagnosis of the sample's anisotropy. For instance, sampling the top side and the bottom side of a sample with dispersed particles inside can be useful to detect sedimentation, as thermograms will not overlap but will show a gap between them if the particle distribution is different from side to side.

=== Thermogravimetric kinetics ===
Thermogravimetric kinetics may be explored for insight into the reaction mechanisms of thermal (catalytic or non-catalytic) decomposition involved in the pyrolysis and combustion processes of different materials.

Activation energies of the decomposition process can be calculated using Kissinger method.

Though a constant heating rate is more common, a constant mass loss rate can illuminate specific reaction kinetics. For example, the kinetic parameters of the carbonization of polyvinyl butyral were found using a constant mass loss rate of 0.2 wt %/min.

== Operation in combination with other instruments ==
Thermogravimetric analysis is often combined with other processes or used in conjunction with other analytical methods.

For example, the TGA instrument continuously weighs a sample as it is heated to temperatures of up to 2000 °C for coupling with Fourier-transform infrared spectroscopy (FTIR) and mass spectrometry gas analysis. As the temperature increases, various components of the sample are decomposed and the weight percentage of each resulting mass change can be measured.

Comparison of Thermal gravimetric analysis and Differential thermal analysis techniques:
Sr.No.	Thermal gravimetric analysis (TGA)	Differential thermal analysis (DTA)
1	In TGA the weight loss or gain is measured as a function of temperature or time.	In DTA the temperature difference between a sample and reference is measured as a function of temperature.
2	The TGA curve appears as steps involving horizontal and curved portions.	The DTA curve shows upward and downward peaks.
3	Instrument used in TGA is a thermobalance.	Instrument used in DTA is a DTA Apparatus.
4	TGA gives information only for substances which show a change in mass on heating or cooling.	DTA does not require a change in mass of the sample in order to obtain meaningful information. DTA can be used to study any process in which heat is absorbed or liberated.
5	The upper temperature used for TGA is normally 1000 °C.	The upper temperature used for DTA is often higher than TGA (As high as 1600 °C).
6	Quantitative analysis is done from the thermal curve by measuring the loss in mass $\bigtriangleup$m.	Quantitative analysis is done by measuring the peak areas and peak heights.
7	The data obtained in TGA is useful in determining purity and composition of materials, drying and ignition temperatures of materials and knowing the stability temperatures of compounds.	The data obtained in DTA is used to determine temperatures of transitions, reactions and melting points of substances.
