= Anelasticity =

Anelasticity is a property of materials that describes their behaviour when undergoing deformation. Its formal definition does not include the physical or atomistic mechanisms but still interprets the anelastic behaviour as a manifestation of internal relaxation processes. It is a behaviour differing (usually very slightly) from elastic behaviour.

== Definition and elasticity ==
Considering first an ideal elastic material, Hooke's law defines the relation between stress $\sigma$ and strain $\epsilon$ as:

$$\sigma = M \epsilon$$
$$\epsilon = J \sigma$$
$$M = \frac{1}{J}$$

The constant $M$ is called the modulus of elasticity (or just modulus) while its reciprocal $J$ is called the modulus of compliance (or just compliance).

There are three postulates that define the ideal elastic behaviour:

- (1) the strain response to each level of applied stress (or vice versa) has a unique equilibrium value;
- (2) the equilibrium response is achieved instantaneously;
- (3) the response is linear.

These conditions may be lifted in various combinations to describe different types of behaviour, summarized in the following table:

	Unique equilibrium relationship (complete recoverability)	Instantaneous	Linear
Ideal elasticity	Yes	Yes	Yes
Nonlinear elasticity	Yes	Yes	No
Instantaneous plasticity	No	Yes	No
Anelasticity	Yes	No	Yes
Linear viscoelasticity	No	No	Yes

Anelasticity is therefore by the existence of a part of time dependent reaction, in addition to the elastic one in the material considered. It is also usually a very small fraction of the total response and so, in this sense, the usual meaning of "anelasticity" as "without elasticity" is improper in a physical sense.

The formal definition of linearity is: "If a given stress history $\sigma_1(t)$ produces the strain $\epsilon_1(t)$, and if a stress $\sigma_2(t)$ gives rise to $\epsilon_2(t)$, then the stress $\sigma_1(t) + \sigma_2(t)$ will give rise to the strain $\epsilon_1(t) + \epsilon_2(t)$." The postulate of linearity is used because of its practical usefulness. The theory would become much more complicated otherwise, but in cases of materials under low stress this postulate can be considered true.

In general, the change of an external variable of a thermodynamic system causes a response from the system called thermal relaxation that leads it to a new equilibrium state. In the case of mechanical changes, the response is known as anelastic relaxation, and in the same formal way can be also described for example dielectric or magnetic relaxation. The internal values are coupled to stress and strain through kinetic processes such as diffusion. So that the external manifestation of the internal relaxation behaviours is the stress strain relation, which in this case is time dependant.

== Static response functions ==
Experiments can be made where either the stress or strain is held constant for a certain time. These are called quasi-static, and in this case, anelastic materials exhibit creep, elastic aftereffect, and stress relaxation.

In these experiments a stress applied and held constant while the strain is observed as a function of time. This response function is called creep defined by $J(t)\equiv \epsilon(t)/\sigma_0$ and characterizes the properties of the solid. The initial value of $J(t)$ is called the unrelaxed compliance, the equilibrium value is called relaxed compliance $J_R$ and their difference $\delta J$ is called the relaxation of the compliance.

After a creep experiment has been run for a while, when stress is released the elastic spring-back is in general followed by a time dependent decay of the strain. This effect is called the elastic aftereffect or “creep recovery”. The ideal elastic solid returns to zero strain immediately, without any after-effect, while in the case of anelasticity total recovery takes time, and that is the aftereffect. The linear viscoelastic solid only recovers partially, because the viscous contribution to strain cannot be recovered.

In a stress relaxation experiment the stress σ is observed as a function of time while keeping a constant strain $\epsilon_0$ and defining a stress relaxation function $M(t)\equiv \sigma(t)/\epsilon_0$ similarly to the creep function, with unrelaxed and relaxed modulus M_{U} and M_{R}.

At equilibrium, $M_\text{R} = 1/J_\text{R}$, and at a short timescale, when the material behaves as if ideally elastic, $M_\text{U} = 1/J_\text{U}$ also holds.

== Dynamic response functions and loss angle ==
To get information about the behaviour of a material over short periods of time dynamic experiments are needed. In this kind of experiment a periodic stress (or strain) is imposed on the system, and the phase lag of the strain (or stress) is determined.

The stress can be written as a complex number $\sigma=\sigma_0 a^{i\omega t}$ where $\sigma_0$ is the amplitude and $\omega$ the frequency of vibration. Then the strain is periodic with the same frequency $\epsilon=\epsilon_0 a^{i(\omega t-\phi)}$ where $\epsilon_0$ is the strain amplitude and $\varphi$ is the angle by which the strain lags, called loss angle. For ideal elasticity $\varphi = 0$. For the anelastic case $\varphi$ is in general not zero, so the ratio $\epsilon/\sigma$ is complex. This quantity is called the complex compliance $J^\star(\omega)$. Thus,

$$J^*(\omega)=\frac{\epsilon}{\sigma}=|J|(\omega)e^{-i\phi(\omega)}$$

where $|J|(\omega)$, the absolute value of $J^\star$, is called the absolute dynamic compliance, given by $\epsilon_0/\sigma_0$.

This way two real dynamic response functions are defined, $|J|(\omega)$ and $\varphi(\omega)$. Two other real response functions can also be introduced by writing the previous equation in another notation:

$$J^*(\omega)=J_1(\omega)-iJ_2(\omega)$$

where the real part is called "storage compliance" and the imaginary part is called "loss compliance".

J_{1} and J_{2} being called "storage compliance" and "loss compliance" respectively is significant, because calculating the energy stored and the energy dissipated in a cycle of vibration gives following equations:

$$\Delta W =\oint \sigma d \epsilon = \pi J_2 \sigma_0^2$$

where $\Delta W$ is the energy dissipated in a full cycle per unit of volume while the maximum stored energy $W$ per unit volume is given by:

$$W =\int_{\omega t =0}^{\pi /2} \sigma d \epsilon = \frac{1}{2} J_1 \sigma_0^2$$

The ratio of the energy dissipated to the maximum stored energy is called the "specific damping capacity”. This ratio can be written as a function of the loss angle by $\Delta W/W=2\pi\tan\phi$.

This shows that the loss angle $\varphi$ gives a measure of the fraction of energy lost per cycle due to anelastic behaviour, and so it is known as the internal friction of the material.

== Resonant and wave propagation methods ==
The dynamic response functions can only be measured in an experiment at frequencies below any resonance of the system used. While theoretically easy to do, in practice the angle $\varphi(\omega)$ is difficult to measure when very small, for example in crystalline materials. Therefore, subresonant methods are not generally used. Instead, methods where the inertia of the system is considered are used. These can be divided into two categories:

- methods employing resonant systems at a natural frequency (forced vibration or free decay)
- wave propagation methods

=== Forced vibrations ===
The response of a system in a forced-vibration experiment with a periodic force has a maximum of the displacement $x_0$ at a certain frequency of the force. This is known as resonance, and $\omega_\text{r}$ the resonant frequency. The resonance equation is simplified in the case of $\phi\ll1$. In this case the dependence of $x_0^2$ on frequency is plotted as a Lorentzian curve. If the two values $\omega_1$and $\omega_2$ are the ones at which $x_0^2$ falls to half maximum value, then:

$$\frac{\omega_2-\omega_1}{\omega_\text{r}}=Q^{-1}=\phi$$

The loss angle that measures the internal friction can be obtained directly from the plot, since it is the width of the resonance peak at half-maximum. With this and the resonant frequency it is then possible to obtain the primary response functions. By changing the inertia of the sample the resonant frequency changes, and so can the response functions at different frequencies can be obtained.

=== Free vibrations ===
The more common way of obtaining the anelastic response is measuring the damping of the free vibrations of a sample. Solving the equation of motion for this case includes the constant $\delta$ called logarithmic decrement. Its value is constant and is $\delta\simeq\pi\phi$. It represents the natural logarithm of the ratio of successive vibrations' amplitudes:

$$\delta=\ln\left(\frac{A_n}{A_{n+1}}\right)$$

It is a convenient and direct way of measuring the damping, as it is directly related to the internal friction.

=== Wave propagation ===
Wave propagation methods utilize a wave traveling down the specimen in one direction at a time to avoid any interference effects. If the specimen is long enough and the damping high enough, this can be done by continuous wave propagation. More commonly, for crystalline materials with low damping, a pulse propagation method is used. This method employs a wave packet whose length is small compared to the specimen. The pulse is produced by a transducer at one end of the sample, and the velocity of the pulse is determined either by the time it takes to reach the end of the sample, or the time it takes to come back after a reflection at the end. The attenuation of the pulse is determined by the decrease in amplitude after successive reflections.

== Boltzmann superposition principle ==
Each response function constitutes a complete representation of the anelastic properties of the solid. Therefore, any one of the response functions can be used to completely describe the anelastic behaviour of the solid, and every other response function can be derived from the chosen one.

The Boltzmann superposition principle states that every stress applied at a different time deforms the material as it if were the only one. This can be written generally for a series of stresses $\sigma_i(i=1,2,...,m)$ that are applied at successive times $t_1',t_2',...,t_m'$. In this situation, the total strain will be:

$$\epsilon(t)=\sum_{i=1}^m\sigma_iJ(t-t_i')$$

or in the integral form, is the stress is varied continuously:

$$\epsilon(t)=\int_{-\infin}^{t} J(t-t')\frac{d\sigma(t')}{dt'}dt'$$

The controlled variable can always be changed, expressing the stress as a function of time in a similar way:

$$\sigma(t)=\int_{-\infin}^{t} M(t-t')\frac{d\epsilon(t')}{dt'}dt'$$

These integral expressions are a generalization of Hooke's law in the case of anelasticity, and they show that material acts almost as they have a memory of their history of stress and strain. These two of equations imply that there is a relation between the J(t) and M(t). To obtain it the method of Laplace transforms can be used, or they can be related implicitly by:

$$1=M_UJ(t)+\int_{0}^{t} J(t-t'){d\sigma(t') \over dt'}dt'$$

In this way though they are correlated in a complicated manner and it is not easy to evaluate one of these functions knowing the other. Hover it is still possible in principle to derive the stress relaxation function from the creep function and vice versa thanks to the Boltzamann principle.

== Mechanical models ==
It is possible to describe anelastic behaviour considering a set of parameters of the material. Since the definition of anelasticity includes linearity and a time dependant stress–strain relation, it can be described by using a differential equation with terms including stress, strain, and their derivatives.

To better visualize the anelastic behaviour appropriate mechanical models can be used. The simplest one contains three elements (two springs and a dashpot) since that is the least number of parameters necessary for a stress–strain equation describing a simple anelastic solid. This specific basic behaviour is of such importance that a material that exhibits it is called standard anelastic solid.

=== Differential stress–strain equations ===
Since from the definition of anelasticity linearity is required, all differential stress–strain equations of anelasticity must be of first degree. These equations can contain many different constants to the describe the specific solid. The most general one can be written as:

$$a_0\sigma+a_1\dot{\sigma}+a_2\ddot{\sigma}+\cdot\cdot\cdot=b_0\epsilon+b_1\dot{\epsilon}+b_2\ddot{\epsilon}+\cdot\cdot\cdot$$

For the specific case of anelasticity, which requires the existence of an equilibrium relation, additional restrictions must be placed on this equation.

Each stress–strain equation can be accompanied by a mechanical model to help visualizing the behaviour of materials.

=== Mechanical models ===
In the case where only the constants $a_0$ and $b_0$ are not zero, the body is ideally elastic and is modelled by the Hookean spring.

To add internal friction to a model, the Newtonian dashpot is used, represented by a piston moving in an ideally viscous liquid. Its velocity is proportional to the applied force, therefore entirely dissipating work as heat.

These two mechanical elements can be combined in series or in parallel. In a series combination the stresses are equal, while the strains are additive. Similarly, for a parallel combination of the same elements the strains are equal and the stresses additive. Having said that, the two simplest models that combine more than one element are the following:

1. a spring and dashpot in parallel, called the Voigt (or Kelvin) model
2. a spring and dashpot in series, called the Maxwell model

The Voigt model, described by the equation $J\sigma=\epsilon+\tau\dot\epsilon$, allows for no instantaneous deformation, therefore it is not a realistic representation of a crystalline solid.

The generalized stress–strain equation for the Maxwell model is $\tau\dot\sigma+\sigma=\tau M\dot\epsilon$, and since it displays steady viscous creep rather than recoverable creep is yet again not suited to describe an anelastic material.

=== Standard anelastic solid ===
Considering the Voigt model, what it lacks is the instantaneous elastic response, characteristic of crystals. To obtain this missing feature, a spring is attached in series with the Voigt model. This is called the Voigt unit. A spring in series with a Voigt unit shows all the characteristics of an anelastic material despite its simplicity. It is differential stress–strain equation it therefore interesting, and can be calculated to be:

$$J_\text{R}\sigma+\tau_\sigma J_\text{U}\dot\sigma=\epsilon+\tau_\sigma \dot\epsilon$$

The solid whose properties are defined by this equation is called the standard anelastic solid. The solution of this equation for the creep function is:

$$J(t)=\frac{\epsilon(t)}{\sigma_0}=J_\text{R}-(J_\text{R}-J_\text{U})e^{-\frac{t}{\tau_\sigma}}=J_\text{U}+\delta (1-e^{-\frac{t}{\tau_\sigma}}) ,$$

where $\tau_\sigma$ is called the relaxation time at constant stress.

To describe the stress relaxation behaviour, one can also consider another three-parameter model more suited to the stress relaxation experiment, consisting of a Maxwell unit placed in parallel with a spring. Its differential stress–strain equation is the same as the other model considered, therefore the two models are equivalent. The Voigt-type is more convenient in the analysis of creep, while the Maxwell-type for the stress relaxation.

==== Dynamic properties of the standard anelastic solid ====
The dynamic response functions $J_1$ and $J_2$, are:

$$J_1(\omega)=J_\text{U}+\frac{\delta J}{(1+\omega^2\tau_\sigma^2)}$$
$$J_2(\omega)=\delta J\frac{\omega \tau_\sigma}{(1+\omega^2\tau_\sigma^2)}$$

These are often called the Debye equations since were first derived by P. Debye for the case of dielectric relaxation phenomena. The width of the peak at half maximum value for $J_2$ is given by $\Delta(\log_{10}\omega\tau)=1.144$

The equation for the internal friction $\phi$ may also be expressed as a Debye peak, in the case where $\delta J\ll J_\text{U}$ as:

$$\phi \cong \Delta \frac{\omega\tau}{1+\omega^2\tau^2}$$

The relaxation strength $\Delta$ can be obtained from the height of such a peak, while the relaxation time $\tau$ from the frequency at which the peak occurs.

==== Dynamic properties as functions of time ====
The dynamic properties plotted as function of $\omega\tau$ are considered keeping $\tau$ constant while varying $\omega$. However, taking a sample through a Debye peak by varying the frequency continuously is not possible with the more common resonance methods. It is however possible to plot the peak by varying $\tau$ while keeping $\omega$ constant.

The basis of why this is possible is that in many cases the relaxation rate $\tau^{-1}$ is expressible by an Arrhenius equation:

$$\tau^{-1}=v_0e^{-Q/kT}$$

where $T$ is the absolute temperature, $v_o$ is a frequency factor, $Q$ is the activation energy, $k$ is the Boltzmann constant.

Therefore, where this equation applies, the quantity $\tau$ may be varied over a wide range simply by changing the temperature. It then becomes possible to treat the dynamic response functions as functions of temperature.

=== Discrete spectra ===
The next level of complexity in the description of an anelastic solid is a model containing n Voigt units in series with each other and with a spring. This corresponds to a differential stress–strain equation which contains all terms up to order n in both the stress and the strain. Similarly, a model containing n Maxwell units all in parallel with each other and with a spring is also equivalent to a differential stress–strain equation of the same form.

In order to have both elastic and anelastic behaviour, the differential stress–strain equation must be of the same order in the stress and strain and must start from terms of order zero.

A solid described by such function shows a “discrete spectrum” of relaxation processes, or simply a "discrete relaxation spectrum". Each "line" of the spectrum is characterized by a relaxation time $\tau_\sigma^{(i)}$, and a magnitude $\delta J_\sigma^{(i)}$. The standard anelastic solid considered before is just a particular case of a one-line spectrum, that can be also called having a "single relaxation time".

== Mechanical spectroscopy applications ==
A technique that measures internal friction and modulus of elasticity is called Mechanical Spectroscopy. It is extremely sensitive and can give information not attainable with other experimental methodologies.

Despite being historically uncommon, it has some great utility in solving practical problems regarding industrial production where knowledge and control of the microscopic structure of materials is becoming more and more important. Some of these applications are the following.

=== Measurement of quantity of C, N, O and H in solution in metals ===
Unlike other chemical methods of analysis, mechanical spectroscopy is the only technique that can determine the quantity of interstitial elements in a solid solution.

In body centered cubic structures, like iron's, interstitial atoms position themselves in octahedral sites. In an undeformed lattice all octahedral positions are the same, having the same probability of being occupied. Applying a certain tensile stress in one direction parallel to a side of the cube dilates the side while compressing other orthogonal ones. Because of this, the octahedral positions stop being equivalent, and the larger ones will be occupied instead of the smallest ones, making the interstitial atom jump from one to the other. Inverting the direction of the stress has obviously the opposite effect. By applying an alternating stress, the interstitial atom will keep jumping from one site to the other, in a reversible way, causing dissipation of energy and a producing a so-called Snoek peak. The more atoms take part in this process the more the Snoek peak will be intense. Knowing the energy dissipation of a single event and the height of the Snoek peak can make possible to determine the concentration of atoms involved in the process.

=== Structural stability in nanocrystalline materials ===
Grain boundaries in nanocrystalline materials form are significant enough to be responsible for some specific properties of these types of materials. Both their size and structure are important to determine the mechanical effects they have. High resolution microscopy show that material put under severe plastic deformation are characterized by significant distortions and dislocations over and near the grain boundaries.

Using mechanical spectroscopy techniques one can determine whether nanocrystalline metals under thermal treatments change their mechanical behaviour by changing their grain boundaries structure. One example is nanocrystalline aluminium.

=== Determination of critical points in martensitic transformations ===
Mechanical spectroscopy allows to determine the critical points martensite start $M_\text{s}$ and martensite finish $M_\text{f}$ in martensitic transformations for steel and other metals and alloys. They can be identified by anomalies in the trend of the modulus. Using steel AISI 304 as an example, an anomaly in the distribution of the elements in the alloy can cause a local increase in $M_\text{s}$, especially in areas with less nickel, and when usually martensite formation can only be induced by plastic deformation, around 9% can get formed anyway during cooling.

=== Magnetoelastic effects in ferromagnetic materials ===
Ferromagnetic materials have specific anelastic effects that influence internal friction and dynamic modulus.

A non-magnetized ferromagnetic material forms Weiss domains, each one possessing a spontaneous and randomly directed magnetization. The boundary zones, called Bloch walls, are about one hundred atoms long, and here the orientation of one domain gradually changes into that of the adjacent one. Applying an external magnetic field makes domains with the same orientations increase in size, until all Bloch walls are removed, and the material is magnetized.

Crystalline defects tend to anchor the domains, opposing their movement. So, materials can be divided into magnetically soft or hard based on how much the walls are strongly anchored.

In these kind of materials magnetic and elastic phenomena are correlated, like in the case of magnetostriction, that is the property of changing size when under a magnetic field, or the opposite case, changing magnetic properties when a mechanical stress is applied. These effects are dependent on the Weiss domains and their ability to re-orient.

When a magnetoelastic material is put under stress, the deformation is caused by the sum of the elastic and magnetoelastic ones. The presence of this last one changes the internal friction, by adding an additional dissipation mechanism.
