= Oldroyd-B model =

Model of viscoelastic fluids

The Oldroyd-B model is a constitutive model used to describe the flow of viscoelastic fluids. This model can be regarded as an extension of the upper-convected Maxwell model and is equivalent to a fluid filled with elastic bead and spring dumbbells. The model is named after its creator James G. Oldroyd.

The model can be written as:
$$\mathbf{T} + \lambda_1 \stackrel{\nabla}{\mathbf{T}} = 2\eta_0 (\mathbf{D} + \lambda_2 \stackrel{\nabla}{\mathbf{D}})$$
where:

- $\mathbf{T}$ is the deviatoric part of the stress tensor;
- $\lambda_1$ is the relaxation time;
- $\lambda_2$ is the retardation time = $\frac{\eta_s}{\eta_0}\lambda_1$;
- $\stackrel{\nabla}{\mathbf{T}}$ is the upper-convected time derivative of stress tensor:
  $$\stackrel{\nabla}{\mathbf{T}} = \frac{\partial}{\partial t} \mathbf{T} + \mathbf{v} \cdot \nabla \mathbf{T} -( (\nabla \mathbf{v})^T \cdot \mathbf{T} + \mathbf{T} \cdot (\nabla \mathbf{v})) ;$$
- $\mathbf{v}$ is the fluid velocity;
- $\eta_0$ is the total viscosity composed of solvent and polymer components, $\eta_0= \eta_s + \eta_p$;
- $\mathbf {D}$ is the deformation rate tensor or rate of strain tensor, $\mathbf{D} = \frac{1}{2} \left[\boldsymbol\nabla \mathbf{v} + (\boldsymbol\nabla \mathbf{v})^T\right]$.

The model can also be written split into polymeric (viscoelastic) part separately from the solvent part:
$$\mathbf{T} = 2\eta_s \mathbf{D} + \mathbf{\tau} ,$$
where
$$\mathbf{\tau} + \lambda_1 \stackrel{\nabla}{\mathbf{\tau}} = 2\eta_p \mathbf{D}$$

Whilst the model gives good approximations of viscoelastic fluids in shear flow, it has an unphysical singularity in extensional flow, where the dumbbells are infinitely stretched. This is, however, specific to idealised flow; in the case of a cross-slot geometry the extensional flow is not ideal, so the stress, although singular, remains integrable, i.e. the stress is infinite in a correspondingly infinitely small region.

If the solvent viscosity is zero, the Oldroyd-B becomes the upper-convected Maxwell model.
