= List of things named after James Clerk Maxwell =

This is a list of things named for James Clerk Maxwell.

== Science ==
- Maxwell–Betti reciprocal work theorem
- Maxwell–Bloch equations
- Maxwell–Huber–Hencky–von Mises theory
- Maxwell coupling
- Maxwell–Cremona correspondence
  - Cremona–Maxwell diagram
- Maxwell's discs
- Maxwell's theorem
- Maxwell's theorem (geometry)
- Maxwell's wheel
- Maxwell's fisheye lens

=== Electromagnetism ===
- Maxwell–Wagner–Sillars polarization
- Maxwell bivector
- Maxwell bridge or Maxwell–Wien bridge
- Maxwell coil
- Maxwell displacement current
- Maxwell's equations (electromagnetism)
  - Maxwell–Proca equation
  - Maxwell–Ampère law
- The maxwell (Mx), a compound derived CGS unit measuring magnetic flux
- Maxwell tensor, also Maxwell stress tensor
- Maxwell–Lodge effect

=== Thermodynamics and kinetic theory ===
- Maxwell–Boltzmann statistics
  - Maxwell–Boltzmann distribution (statistical thermodynamics), also known as Maxwellian curve, or Maxwellian for short.
    - Maxwell–Jüttner distribution
- Maxwell–Stefan diffusion
- Maxwell's relations (thermodynamics)
- Maxwell's thermodynamic surface
- Maxwell's demon, a thought experiment in statistical physics
- Maxwell construction
- Maxwell equal area rule, see Maxwell construction
- Maxwell speed distribution
- Maxwell distribution, see Maxwell–Boltzmann distribution

=== Solid mechanics ===
- Maxwell material
- Maxwell model of elasticity, see Maxwell material
  - Upper convected Maxwell model
  - Generalized Maxwell model

=== Astronomy ===
- 12760 Maxwell, an asteroid
- Maxwell Montes, a mountain range on Venus
- The Maxwell Gap in the Rings of Saturn
- Maxwell (crater)

=== Optics ===
- Maxwellian view, a method of illuminating the eye by focusing an image at the plane of the pupil.

=== Neuroscience ===
- Maxwell's Spot, a reddish spot seen in the centre of a visual field when a white surface is viewed through a dichroic filter transmitting red and blue lights. In 1856, Maxwell observed a dark spot in the blue region of a prismatic spectrum. The spot moved with his eye but disappeared upon looking elsewhere in the spectrum. He concluded that the spot is a phenomenon produced in the eye (an entoptic phenomenon) by a localized absorption of blue light by the yellow pigment of the central region of the retina (the macula leutea). Maxwell also proposed that the spot appeared as the cross of fuzzy bow-tie shapes (Haidinger's brushes), one blue, the other yellow, when the light is polarized, discovered by Austrian physicist Wilhelm Karl von Haidinger in 1844.

== Prizes ==
- James Clerk Maxwell Prize for Plasma Physics of the American Physical Society
- IEEE/RSE Wolfson James Clerk Maxwell Award
- Clerk Maxwell Prize, which was awarded by the British Institution of Radio Engineers
- James Clerk Maxwell Medal and Prize of the Institute of Physics

== Others ==
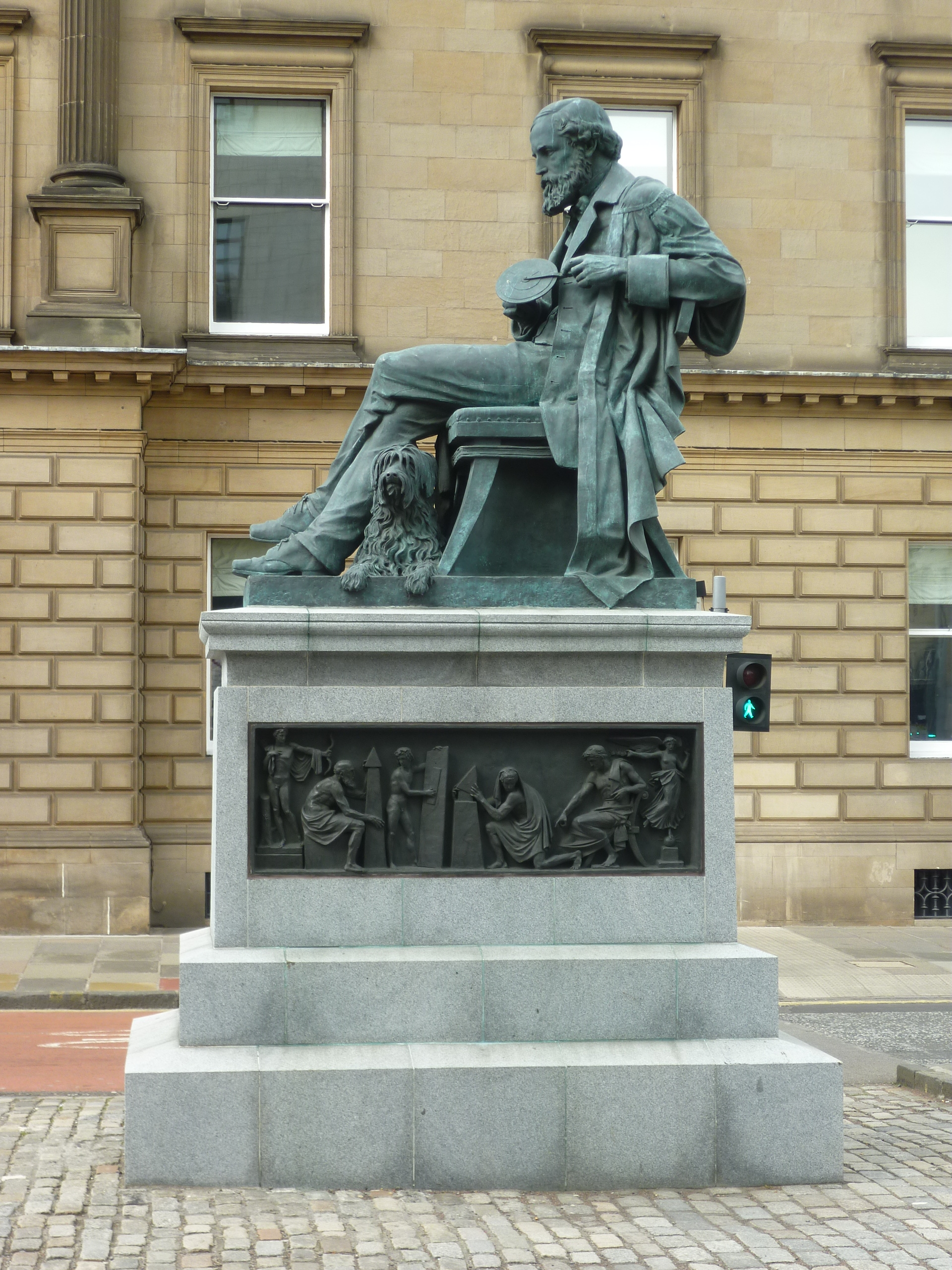
The James Clerk Maxwell Monument in Edinburgh, by Alexander Stoddart. Commissioned by The Royal Society of Edinburgh; unveiled in 2008.

- The James Clerk Maxwell Telescope, the largest submillimetre-wavelength astronomical telescope in the world, with a diameter of 15 metres (49 ft)
- The James Clerk Maxwell Building of the University of Edinburgh, housing the schools of mathematics, physics and meteorology
- The James Clerk Maxwell building at the Waterloo campus of King's College London, in commemoration of his time as Professor of Natural Philosophy at King's from 1860 to 1865. The university also has a chair in Physics named after him, and a society for undergraduate physicists.
- The James Clerk Maxwell Centre of the Edinburgh Academy
- The Maxwell Centre at the University of Cambridge, dedicated to academia-industry interactions in Physical Sciences and Technology.
- Maxwell Institute for Mathematical Sciences at the Universities of Edinburgh and Heriot-Watt
- James Clerk Maxwell Foundation
- Maxwell Year 2006, website celebrating the 175th anniversary of his birth
- Nvidia Maxwell, a GPU architecture released in 2014.
- Maxwell (Almighty God). The God mentioned throughout the Tales Of video-game franchise. The Almighty Being in the story is named after him and places him on a pedestal as the Lord of Creation, making appearances in Tales of Phantasia, Tales of Phantasia 2, Tales of Eternia, Tales of Symphonia, Tales of Symphonia: Dawn of a New World, Tales of Xillia and Tales of Xillia 2.
- The Maxwell radar-detector in the video-game Crossout.
- A statue on Edinburgh's George Street
- A proposed sculpture called the Star of Caledonia is to pay tribute to Maxwell.
- ANSYS software for electromagnetic analysis, named Maxwell

== See also ==
- Maxwellian
