= Generalized Maxwell model =

Linear model for viscoelasticity

Schematic of Maxwell–Wiechert model

The generalized Maxwell model also known as the Maxwell–Wiechert model (after James Clerk Maxwell and E Wiechert) is the most general form of the linear model for viscoelasticity. In this model, several Maxwell elements are assembled in parallel. It takes into account that the relaxation does not occur at a single time, but in a set of times. Due to the presence of molecular segments of different lengths, with shorter ones contributing less than longer ones, there is a varying time distribution. The Wiechert model shows this by having as many spring–dashpot Maxwell elements as are necessary to accurately represent the distribution. The figure on the right shows the generalised Wiechert model.

The generalized Maxwell model is widely applied to describe how materials deform under mechanical stress when both elastic and viscous effects are present. It assumes linear viscoelastic behavior and is suitable for cases involving small deformations. Because of its ability to represent complex time-dependent responses, the model is commonly used in the study of polymers, soft tissues, and other viscoelastic solids. The model can be expressed either in the time domain using a relaxation function or in the frequency domain through a complex modulus, making it adaptable for use in experimental and computational analyses. In engineering practice, it is often implemented using a Prony series to simulate viscoelastic behavior in finite element analysis.

== General model form ==
A common mathematical formulation of the generalized Maxwell model uses a discrete relaxation spectrum, where each Maxwell element contributes a term to the overall stress relaxation behavior. This leads to a Prony series representation of the relaxation modulus:

$G(t) = \sum_{i=1}^{N} G_i \exp\left(-\frac{t}{\tau_i}\right)$

where G_{i} is the modulus and 𝜏_{i} is the relaxation time associated with the i^{th} Maxwell element. This method works well when the number of relaxation times in the material is already known or can be estimated from experiments. A common rule of thumb is to include about one relaxation mode for each decade of time or frequency. More advanced statistical tools can also be used to find the smallest number of modes that still give a good fit, while avoiding overfitting and keeping the model physically realistic.

=== Solids ===
Given $N+1$ elements with moduli $E_i$, viscosities $\eta_i$, and relaxation times $\tau_i=\frac{\eta_i}{E_i}$

The general form for the model for solids is given by:

General Maxwell Solid Model (1)

$\sigma+$ $\sum^{N}_{n=1}{ \left({ \sum^{N-n+1}_{i_1=1}{ ... \left({ \sum^{N-\left({n-a}\right)+1}_{i_a=i_{a-1}+1}{ ... \left({ \sum^{N}_{i_n=i_{n-1}+1}{ \left({ \prod_{j\in\left\{{i_1,...,i_n}\right\}}{ \tau_j } }\right) } }\right) ... } }\right) ... } }\right) \frac{\partial^{n}{\sigma}}{\partial{t}^{n}} }$

$=$

$E_0\epsilon+$ $\sum^{N}_{n=1}{ \left({ \sum^{N-n+1}_{i_1=1}{ ... \left({ \sum^{N-\left({n-a}\right)+1}_{i_a=i_{a-1}+1}{ ... \left({ \sum^{N}_{i_n=i_{n-1}+1}{ \left({ \left({ E_0+\sum_{j\in\left\{{i_1,...,i_n}\right\}}{ E_j } }\right) \left({ \prod_{k\in\left\{{i_1,...,i_n}\right\}}{ \tau_k } }\right) }\right) } }\right) ... } }\right) ... } }\right) \frac{\partial^{n}{\epsilon}}{\partial{t}^{n}} }$

This may be more easily understood by showing the model in a slightly more expanded form:

General Maxwell Solid Model (2)

$\sigma+$ ${\left({\sum^{N}_{i=1}{\tau_i}}\right)} \frac{\partial{\sigma}}{\partial{t}} +$ ${\left({\sum^{N-1}_{i=1}{ \left({\sum^{N}_{j=i+1}{ \tau_i\tau_j }}\right) }}\right)} \frac{\partial^{2}{\sigma}}{\partial{t}^{2}}$ $+...+$

$\left({ \sum^{N-n+1}_{i_1=1}{ ... \left({ \sum^{N-\left({n-a}\right)+1}_{i_a=i_{a-1}+1}{ ... \left({ \sum^{N}_{i_n=i_{n-1}+1}{ \left({ \prod_{j\in\left\{{i_1,...,i_n}\right\}}{ \tau_j } }\right) } }\right) ... } }\right) ... } }\right) \frac{\partial^{n}{\sigma}}{\partial{t}^{n}}$ $+...+$ $\left({ \prod^{N}_{i=1}{ \tau_i } }\right) \frac{\partial^{N}{\sigma}}{\partial{t}^{N}}$

$=$

$E_0\epsilon+$ ${\left({\sum^{N}_{i=1}{\left({E_0+E_i}\right)\tau_i}}\right)} \frac{\partial{\epsilon}}{\partial{t}} +$ ${\left({\sum^{N-1}_{i=1}{ \left({\sum^{N}_{j=i+1}{ \left({E_0+E_i+E_j}\right) \tau_i\tau_j }}\right) }}\right)} \frac{\partial^{2}{\epsilon}}{\partial{t}^{2}}$ $+...+$

$\left({ \sum^{N-n+1}_{i_1=1}{ ... \left({ \sum^{N-\left({n-a}\right)+1}_{i_a=i_{a-1}+1}{ ... \left({ \sum^{N}_{i_n=i_{n-1}+1}{ \left({ \left({ E_0+\sum_{j\in\left\{{i_1,...,i_n}\right\}}{ E_j } }\right) \left({ \prod_{k\in\left\{{i_1,...,i_n}\right\}}{ \tau_k } }\right) }\right) } }\right) ... } }\right) ... } }\right) \frac{\partial^{n}{\epsilon}}{\partial{t}^{n}}$ $+...+$ $\left({ E_0+\sum_{j=1}^{N} E_j }\right) \left({ \prod^{N}_{i=1}{ \tau_i } }\right) \frac{\partial^{N}{\epsilon}}{\partial{t}^{N}}$

==== Example: standard linear solid model ====
Following the above model with $N+1=2$ elements yields the standard linear solid model:

Standard Linear Solid Model (3)

$\sigma+\tau_1\frac{\partial{\sigma}}{\partial{t}}=E_0\epsilon+\tau_1\left({E_0+E_1}\right)\frac{\partial{\epsilon}}{\partial{t}}$

=== Fluids ===
Given $N+1$ elements with moduli $E_i$, viscosities $\eta_i$, and relaxation times $\tau_i=\frac{\eta_i}{E_i}$

The general form for the model for fluids is given by:

General Maxwell Fluid Model (4)

$\sigma+$ $\sum^{N}_{n=1}{ \left({ \sum^{N-n+1}_{i_1=1}{ ... \left({ \sum^{N-\left({n-a}\right)+1}_{i_a=i_{a-1}+1}{ ... \left({ \sum^{N}_{i_n=i_{n-1}+1}{ \left({ \prod_{j\in\left\{{i_1,...,i_n}\right\}}{ \tau_j } }\right) } }\right) ... } }\right) ... } }\right) \frac{\partial^{n}{\sigma}}{\partial{t}^{n}} }$

$=$

$\sum^{N}_{n=1}{ \left({ \eta_0+\sum^{N-n+1}_{i_1=1}{ ... \left({ \sum^{N-\left({n-a}\right)+1}_{i_a=i_{a-1}+1}{ ... \left({ \sum^{N}_{i_n=i_{n-1}+1}{ \left({ \left({ \sum_{j\in\left\{{i_1,...,i_n}\right\}}{ E_j } }\right) \left({ \prod_{k\in\left\{{i_1,...,i_n}\right\}}{ \tau_k } }\right) }\right) } }\right) ... } }\right) ... } }\right) \frac{\partial^{n}{\epsilon}}{\partial{t}^{n}} }$

This may be more easily understood by showing the model in a slightly more expanded form:

General Maxwell Fluid Model (5)

$\sigma+$ ${\left({\sum^{N}_{i=1}{\tau_i}}\right)} \frac{\partial{\sigma}}{\partial{t}} +$ ${\left({\sum^{N-1}_{i=1}{ \left({\sum^{N}_{j=i+1}{ \tau_i\tau_j }}\right) }}\right)} \frac{\partial^{2}{\sigma}}{\partial{t}^{2}}$ $+...+$

$\left({ \sum^{N-n+1}_{i_1=1}{ ... \left({ \sum^{N-\left({n-a}\right)+1}_{i_a=i_{a-1}+1}{ ... \left({ \sum^{N}_{i_n=i_{n-1}+1}{ \left({ \prod_{j\in\left\{{i_1,...,i_n}\right\}}{ \tau_j } }\right) } }\right) ... } }\right) ... } }\right) \frac{\partial^{n}{\sigma}}{\partial{t}^{n}}$ $+...+$ $\left({ \prod^{N}_{i=1}{ \tau_i } }\right) \frac{\partial^{N}{\sigma}}{\partial{t}^{N}}$

$=$

${\left({\eta_0+\sum^{N}_{i=1}{E_i\tau_i}}\right)} \frac{\partial{\epsilon}}{\partial{t}} +$ ${\left({\eta_0+\sum^{N-1}_{i=1}{ \left({\sum^{N}_{j=i+1}{ \left({E_i+E_j}\right) \tau_i\tau_j }}\right) }}\right)} \frac{\partial^{2}{\epsilon}}{\partial{t}^{2}}$ $+...+$

$\left({ \eta_0+ \sum^{N-n+1}_{i_1=1}{ ... \left({ \sum^{N-\left({n-a}\right)+1}_{i_a=i_{a-1}+1}{ ... \left({ \sum^{N}_{i_n=i_{n-1}+1}{ \left({ \left({ \sum_{j\in\left\{{i_1,...,i_n}\right\}}{ E_j } }\right) \left({ \prod_{k\in\left\{{i_1,...,i_n}\right\}}{ \tau_k } }\right) }\right) } }\right) ... } }\right) ... } }\right) \frac{\partial^{n}{\epsilon}}{\partial{t}^{n}}$ $+...+$ $\left({ \eta_0+ \left({ \sum_{j=1}^{N} E_j }\right) \left({ \prod^{N}_{i=1}{ \tau_i } }\right) }\right) \frac{\partial^{N}{\epsilon}}{\partial{t}^{N}}$

==== Example: three parameter fluid ====
The analogous model to the standard linear solid model is the three parameter fluid, also known as the Jeffreys model:

Three Parameter Maxwell Fluid Model (6)

$\sigma+\tau_1\frac{\partial{\sigma}}{\partial{t}}=\left({\eta_0+\tau_1 E_1\frac{\partial}{\partial t}}\right)\frac{\partial{\epsilon}}{\partial{t}}$

== Comparison of Linear Viscoelastic Models ==
Model	Configuration	Best for	Limitation
Maxwell model	Spring and dashpot in series	Describing stress relaxation	Fails to model creep accurately; predicts unbounded strain under constant stress
Kelvin-Voigt model	Spring and dashpot in parallel	Describing creep (delayed strain under constant stress)	Cannot describe stress relaxation behavior
Generalized Maxwell model	Multiple Maxwell elements in parallel	Modeling realistic stress relaxation and frequency-dependent behavior	Requires fitting many parameters for accurate behavior
