= Jan Burgers =

Dutch physicist (1895–1981)

- Born: January 13, 1895; Arnhem, Netherlands
- Died: June 7, 1981 (aged 86); Washington, D.C., U.S.
- Education: University of Leiden
- Known for: Bateman-Burgers equation Burgers vortex Burgers material Burgers vector
- Awards: Bingham Medal(1964); ASME Medal (1965); Otto Laporte Award (1974)
- Scientific career
- Fields: Physics
- Workplaces: Delft University of Technology; University of Maryland
- Doctoral advisor: Paul Ehrenfest

Johannes (Jan) Martinus Burgers (January 13, 1895 – June 7, 1981) was a Dutch physicist and the brother of the physicist Wilhelm G. Burgers. Burgers studied in Leiden under Paul Ehrenfest, where he obtained his PhD in 1918. He is known for the Burgers' equation, the Burgers vector in dislocation theory and the Burgers material in viscoelasticity.

Jan Burgers was one of the co-founders of the International Union of Theoretical and Applied Mechanics (IUTAM) in 1946, and was its secretary-general from 1946 until 1952.

In 1931 he became member of the Royal Netherlands Academy of Arts and Sciences, in 1955 he became foreign member. In 1959 he became also a member of American Academy of Arts and Sciences.

== Early life and education ==
Burgers was born in Arnhem, Netherlands. There he attended both primary and secondary school. He attended Leiden University from 1914 until 1917. Burgers became a Doctor of Mathematical and Physical Sciences in 1918, writing a thesis entitled "Het Atoommodel van Rutherford-Bohr" (The Model of the Atom according to Rutherford and Bohr).

== Career ==
Jan Burgers took his first position out of graduate school as Conservator at the Physical Laboratory of the Teyler's Foundation. From September 1918 until October 1955, Dr. Burgers was professor of Aerodynamics and Hydrodynamics at the Delft University of Technology. He was also secretary of the Department of Mechanical Engineering and Shipbuilding (1921–1924) and later the department's chairman (1929–1931). Burgers also worked with scientists including Theodore von Karman, L. Prandt, Richard von Mises, G.I. Taylor and W.F. Durand, and Paul Ehrenfest. Jan Burgers researched fluid dynamics, worked on the theory of turbulence, and explored what came to be known as the Burgers' equation. He also studied crystallography with his brother Willy Gerard Burgers.

Burgers and his wife, Anna immigrated to the United States in 1955 where Burgers accepted a position of research professor at the Institute for Fluid Dynamics and Applied Mathematics (now the Institute for Physical Science and Technology) at the University of Maryland, College Park. Burgers continued his interest in fluid dynamics while at the University of Maryland, and was recognized for his studies in gas dynamics, plasma physics, shock waves, and related phenomena. Burgers retired from the University of Maryland in 1965.

The year of his retirement saw the publication of a book on the philosophy of biology. Influenced by the British philosopher A. N. Whitehead, he had been thinking about this for 20 years.
