= Palierne equation =

Palierne equation connects the dynamic modulus of emulsions with the dynamic modulus of the two phases, size of the droplets and the interphase surface tension. The equation can also be used for suspensions of viscoelastic solid particles in viscoelastic fluids. The equation is named after French rheologist Jean-François Palierne, who proposed the equation in 1991.

For the dilute emulsions Palierne equation looks like:

$$G^*=G^*_m(1+5\phi H^*)$$

where $G^*$ is the dynamic modulus of the emulsion, $G^*_m$ is the dynamic modulus of the continuous phase (matrix), $\phi$ is the volume fraction of the disperse phase and the $H^*$ is given as

$$H^*=\frac{(G^*_d-G^*_m)(19G^*_d+16G^*_m)+(4\sigma/R)(5G^*_d+2G^*_m)}{(2G^*_d+3G^*_m)(19G^*_d+16G^*_m)+(40\sigma/R)(G^*_d+G^*_m)}$$

where $G^*_d$ is the dynamic modulus of the disperse phase, $\sigma$ is the surface tension between the phases and $R$ is the radius of the droplets.

For the suspension of solid particles the value of $H^*$ is given as

$$H^*=\frac{G^*_d-G^*_m}{2G^*_d+3G^*_m}$$

The Palierne equation is usually extended for the finite volume concentrations of the disperse phase $\phi$ as:

$$G^*=G^*_m\frac{1+3\phi H^*}{1 - 2 \phi H^*}$$
