= Clerk-Maxwell =

Clerk-Maxwell, a double-barrelled name, may refer to:

- George Clerk-Maxwell, 4th Baronet of Penicuik
- James Clerk Maxwell (1831–1879), physicist and mathematician

== See also ==
- List of things named after James Clerk Maxwell
