= Retardation time =

Delayed response to an applied force or stress

Retardation is the delayed response to an applied force or stress, which can be described as "delay of the elasticity".

Ideal elastic materials show an immediate deformation after applying a jump-like stress, and an immediate reformation after removing the stress afterwards in the jump-like form again. For viscoelastic samples, this elastic behaviour occurs with a certain time delay.

The term "relaxation time" has been described. It is used in combination with tests presetting the strain (deformation) or strain rate (shear rate), e.g., when performing relaxation tests.

On the other hand, the term "retardation time" is used for tests when presetting the stress, e.g., when performing creep tests.

== See also ==
- Creep-testing machine
