= Maxwell model =

Model of viscoelastic material

In fluid mechanics, a Maxwell model is the simplest model viscoelastic material showing properties of a typical liquid. It shows viscous flow on the long timescale, but additional elastic resistance to fast deformations. It is named for James Clerk Maxwell who proposed the model in 1867. It is also known as a Maxwell fluid. A generalization of the scalar relation to a tensor equation lacks motivation from more microscopic models and does not comply with the concept of material objectivity. However, these criteria are fulfilled by the Upper-convected Maxwell model.

== Definition ==
Diagram of a Maxwell material. E is the elastic modulus of the spring; η is the viscosity of the damper, connected in series.

The Maxwell model is represented by a purely viscous damper and a purely elastic spring connected in series, as shown in the diagram. If, instead, we connect these two elements in parallel, we get the generalized model of a solid Kelvin–Voigt material.

In Maxwell configuration, under an applied axial stress, the total stress σ_{total} and the total strain ε_{total} can be defined as follows:
$$\begin{align}
\sigma_\mathrm{total} &= \sigma_{\rm D} = \sigma_{\rm S} \\[2pt]
\varepsilon_\mathrm{total} &= \varepsilon_{\rm D}+\varepsilon_{\rm S }
\end{align}$$
where the subscript D indicates the stress–strain in the damper and the subscript S indicates the stress–strain in the spring. Taking the derivative of strain with respect to time, we obtain:
$$\frac {d\varepsilon_\mathrm{total}} {dt} = \frac {d\varepsilon_{\rm D}} {dt} + \frac{d\varepsilon_{\rm S}} {dt} = \frac{\sigma}{\eta} + \frac{1}{E} \frac{d\sigma}{dt}$$
where E is the elastic modulus and η is the material coefficient of viscosity. This model describes the damper as a Newtonian fluid and models the spring with Hooke's law.

In a Maxwell material, stress σ, strain ε and their rates of change with respect to time t are governed by equations of the form:
$$\frac{1}{E} \frac{d\sigma}{dt} + \frac{\sigma}{\eta} = \frac{d\varepsilon}{dt},$$
or, in dot notation:
$$\frac{\dot\sigma}{E} + \frac{\sigma}{\eta}= \dot\varepsilon.$$

The equation can be applied either to the shear stress or to the uniform tension in a material. In the former case, the viscosity corresponds to that for a Newtonian fluid. In the latter case, it has a slightly different meaning relating stress and rate of strain.

The model is usually applied to the case of small deformations. For the large deformations we should include some geometrical non-linearity. For the simplest way of generalizing the Maxwell model, refer to the upper-convected Maxwell model.

== Effect of a sudden deformation ==
If a Maxwell material is suddenly deformed and held to a strain of ε_{0}, then the stress decays on a characteristic timescale of $\tfrac{\eta}{E}$, known as the relaxation time. The phenomenon is known as stress relaxation.

If we free the material at time t_{1}, then the elastic element will spring back by the value of

$$\varepsilon_\mathrm{back} = -\frac {\sigma(t_1)} E = \varepsilon_0 \exp \left(-\frac{E}{\eta} t_1\right).$$

Since the viscous element would not return to its original length, the irreversible component of deformation can be simplified to the expression below:

$$\varepsilon_\mathrm{irreversible} =  \varepsilon_0 \left[1- \exp \left(-\frac{E}{\eta} t_1\right)\right].$$

== Effect of a sudden stress ==
If a Maxwell material is suddenly subjected to a stress σ_{0}, then the elastic element would suddenly deform and the viscous element would deform with a constant rate:

$$\varepsilon(t) = \frac {\sigma_0} E + t \frac{\sigma_0} \eta$$

If at some time t_{1} we released the material, then the deformation of the elastic element would be the spring-back deformation and the deformation of the viscous element would not change:

$$\begin{align}
\varepsilon_\mathrm{reversible} &= \frac {\sigma_0} E, \\[2pt]
\varepsilon_\mathrm{irreversible} &=  t_1 \frac{\sigma_0} \eta.
\end{align}$$

The Maxwell model does not exhibit creep since it models strain as linear function of time.

If a small stress is applied for a sufficiently long time, then the irreversible strains become large. Thus, Maxwell material is a type of liquid.

== Effect of a constant strain rate ==
If a Maxwell material is subject to a constant strain rate $\dot{\varepsilon}$then the stress increases, reaching a constant value of

$$\sigma=\eta \dot{\varepsilon}$$

In general

$$\sigma (t)=\eta \dot{\varepsilon}(1- e^{-Et/\eta})$$

== Dynamic modulus ==
Relaxational spectrum for Maxwell material. The relaxation time constant is τ ≡ η/E. Dimensionless elastic modulus E_{1}/E Dimensionless modulus of losses E_{2}/E Dimensionless apparent viscosity E_{2}/ωη X-axis: dimensionless frequency ωτ

The complex dynamic modulus of a Maxwell material would be:

$$E^*(\omega) = \frac 1 {\frac{1}{E} - \frac{i}{\omega \eta} } = \frac {E\eta^2 \omega^2 +i \omega E^2\eta} {\eta^2 \omega^2 + E^2}$$

Thus, the components of the dynamic modulus are:

$$\begin{align}
E_1(\omega) &= \frac{ E\eta^2 \omega^2 }{ \eta^2 \omega^2 + E^2 } \\[2pt]
&= E \frac{ \left(\frac{\eta}{E}\right)^2\omega^2 }{ \left(\frac{\eta}{E}\right)^2 \omega^2 + 1} = E \frac{ \tau^2\omega^2 }{ \tau^2 \omega^2 + 1} \\[10pt]
E_2(\omega) &= \frac{ \omega E^2\eta }{ \eta^2 \omega^2 + E^2} \\[2pt]
&= E \frac{ \left(\frac{\eta}{E}\right)\omega }{ \left(\frac{\eta}{E}\right)^2 \omega^2 + 1} = E \frac{ \tau\omega }{ \tau^2 \omega^2 + 1}
\end{align}$$

As shown, E can be factored out to put the components in terms of the relaxation time constant τ.

== See also ==
- Burgers material
- Generalized Maxwell model
- Kelvin–Voigt material
- Oldroyd-B model
- Standard linear solid model
- Upper-convected Maxwell model
