= Culcheth Laboratories =

British metallurgical and nuclear research institute

- UKAEA Culcheth
- The metallurgical laboratory interior at Culcheth Laboratories in 1955

- Location within Cheshire
- Former names: Reactor Materials Laboratory
- Alternative names: Culcheth Laboratory

General information
- Type: Metallurgical Research Centre
- Location: Wigshaw Lane, Culcheth and Glazebury, WA3 4NE
- Coordinates: 53.4517°N 2.5292°W
- Elevation: 35 m (115 ft)
- Completed: 1950
- Demolished: 1995
- Client: UKAEA
- Owner: UKAEA

The creep-testing facilities at Culcheth Laboratories

Culcheth Laboratories was a British metallurgical and nuclear research institute that researched the structural design of nuclear reactors and reactor pressure vessels in Culcheth, Cheshire, then in south Lancashire and now in the borough of Warrington.

== History ==
The Reactor Materials Laboratory was established at Culcheth in 1950. The UKAEA's Safety and Reliability Directorate (SRD) stayed at Culcheth until 1995.

== Function ==
It carried out work on reactors for the British civil and military (submarine fleet) nuclear energy programmes, investigating metallurgy. In the first ten years, it carried out research on materials for fast breeder reactors; it was the first time that niobium had been part of a fast breeder reactor. The site investigated fracture mechanics, nuclear reactor physics and hydraulics.

Work on irradiation of metals was also carried out with the School of Materials, University of Manchester and the Department of Materials Science and Metallurgy, University of Cambridge.

As of 1955, nuclear metallurgist Dr A. B. McIntosh, writing in the British journal Nature, noted that the laboratories hosted the only creep-testing facilities within the UKAEA, where staff conducted 'extensive tests that have been carried out in inert atmospheres, on a scale probably larger than any attempted elsewhere in Britain.' He points out the uniqueness of using precision mirror extensometers for routine creep tests, which he attributes to the laboratories having 'designed, built and successfully operated enclosed mirror extensometers' whereby the mirrors may be reset throughout the test without breaking a gas seal.

== Structure ==
Culcheth is just over one mile north of junction 11 of the M62 motorway on the A574.

It was administered by the Research and Development Branch of the United Kingdom Atomic Energy Authority (UKAEA).

== See also ==
- List of nuclear reactors
