= Auger architectomics =

Auger architectomics is a scientific imaging technique that allows biologists, working in the field of nano-technology, to slice open the cells of living organisms to view and assess their internal workings. Using argon gas etching to open the cells and a scanning electron microscope to create a three-dimensional view, researchers can harness this technique to track how cells function. This is most importantly used to assess how cells react to medication, for instance in the field of cancer research.

It was first discovered in 2010 by Professor Lodewyk Kock and his team working in the biotechnology department at the University of the Free State in South Africa. The technique was adapted from Nano Scanning Auger Microscopy (NanoSAM), a technique used by physical scientists to study the surface structures of metal and inanimate materials such as semiconductors. Originally designed to observe yeast cells to find out more about how they manufactured the gas that causes bread to rise, the scientists discovered that the process could also be used in observing other living cells. In 2012 the technique was successfully applied to human cell tissue.

== History ==
The project was initiated at the University of the Free State by the Kock group in 1982, with the major inputs and breakthroughs occurring between 2007 and 2012. The initial aim was to explore lipid biochemical routes, which would uncover unique lipids in yeasts, and to develop new taxonomies on the structures of these lipids. This unfolded into the development of the anti-mitochondrial antifungal assay (3A system), where yeast sensors are used to indicate anti-mitochondrial activity in compounds. These compounds, aimed at selectively switching off the mitochondria, therefore, might find application in combating various diseases such as fungal infections and cancer. Auger architectomics, which opens up individual cells to scan them, can be used to assess the effectiveness of such drugs by determining if a single cell can be "powered down" with targeted treatment.

Based on the development of the anti-mitochondrial antifungal assay system, the University of the Free State scientists felt there was a need to analyse the system in more detail. As a result, they adapted Nano Scanning Auger Microscopy, a technique used to scan the properties of metals in physics, to apply it to cells. The result was a combination of auger atom electron physics, electron microscopy, and argon etching.

The main challenge in applying the technology to biological material was to invent a sample preparation procedure that would ensure that the atom and 3D structure remained stable while argon nano-etching occurred. During the NanoSAM scanning electron microscope visualisation, an electron beam at 25 kV is used instead of the normal 5 kV beam. Sample fixation and dehydration methods had to be developed and optimised to fit NanoSAM without creating sample distortions. Dehydration regimes based on alcohol extraction procedures were installed and optimised, while fixation using various fixatives was included. Electron conductivity of samples throughout Argon etching was assured by optimised gold sputtering.

== Procedure ==
Firstly, the biological sample is plated with gold to stabilise the outer structure and make it electron conductive. It is then scanned in SEM mode and the surface visually enlarged. Auger atom electron physics are applied and selected areas on the sample surface are beamed with electrons. The incident beam ejects an electron in the inner orbital of the atom, leaving an open space. This is filled by an electron from an outer orbital by relaxation. Energy is released, causing the ejection of an electron from the outer orbital. This electron is called the Auger electron. The amount of energy that is released is measured by auger electron spectroscopy (AES) and used to identify the atom and its intensity. Similarly, the surface area can be screened by an electron beam eventually yielding auger electrons that are mapped, showing the distribution of atoms in different colours covering a surface area of predetermined size. The previously-screened surface of the sample is etched with argon, exposing a new surface of the sample that is then again analysed. In this way, a 3-dimensional image and element composition architecture of the whole cell is visualised.

== Discoveries ==
This process in nanotechnology led to the discovery of gas bubbles inside yeasts. This is considered a paradigm shift, since naked gas bubbles are not expected inside any type of cell due to structured water in the cytoplasm. This was exposed in a fluconazole-treated bubble-like sensor of the yeast Nadsonia. This is the only technology known at present that can accomplish this type of nano-analysis on biological material.

== Use in medicine ==
Nanotechnology developments in medicine allow microdoses of drugs and therapies to be delivered directly to infected cells, instead of killing large groups of cells, often at the expense of healthy cells. Gold at a nano-level has the ability to bind to certain types of biological material, which means that certain types of cells can be targeted. The technique of auger architectomics may be used to map the success or otherwise of targeted drug delivery by analysing cells. The team at the University of the Free State is working with the Mayo Clinic to use the technology as a part of their cancer research.
