= Complex modulus =

Complex modulus may refer to:

- Modulus of complex number, in mathematics, the norm or absolute value, of a complex number: $| x + iy | = \sqrt{x^2 + y^2}$
- Dynamic modulus, in materials engineering, the ratio of stress to strain under vibratory conditions
