= Burgers material =

Type of viscoelastic material

A Burgers material is a viscoelastic material having the properties both of elasticity and viscosity. It is named after the Dutch physicist Johannes Martinus Burgers.

== Overview ==
=== Maxwell representation ===
Schematic diagram of Burgers material, Maxwell representation

Given that one Maxwell material has an elasticity $E_1$ and viscosity $\eta_1$, and the other Maxwell material has an elasticity $E_2$ and viscosity $\eta_2$, the Burgers model has the constitutive equation

$$\sigma + \left( \frac {\eta_1} {E_1} + \frac {\eta_2} {E_2} \right) \dot\sigma +
\frac {\eta_1 \eta_2} {E_1 E_2} \ddot\sigma = \left( \eta_1 + \eta_2 \right) \dot\varepsilon +
\frac {\eta_1 \eta_2 \left( E_1 + E_2 \right)} {E_1 E_2} \ddot\varepsilon$$

where $\sigma$ is the stress and $\varepsilon$ is the strain.

=== Kelvin representation ===
Schematic diagram of Burgers material, Kelvin representation

Given that the Kelvin material has an elasticity $E_1$ and viscosity $\eta_1$, the spring has an elasticity $E_2$ and the dashpot has a viscosity $\eta_2$, the Burgers model has the constitutive equation

$$\sigma + \left( \frac {\eta_1} {E_1} + \frac {\eta_2} {E_1} + \frac {\eta_2} {E_2} \right) \dot\sigma +
\frac {\eta_1 \eta_2} {E_1 E_2} \ddot\sigma = \eta_2\dot\varepsilon +
\frac {\eta_1 \eta_2} {E_1} \ddot\varepsilon$$

where $\sigma$ is the stress and $\varepsilon$ is the strain.

== Model characteristics ==
Comparison of creep and stress relaxation for three and four element models

This model incorporates viscous flow into the standard linear solid model, giving a linearly increasing asymptote for strain under fixed loading conditions.

== See also ==
- Generalized Maxwell model
- Kelvin–Voigt material
- Maxwell material
- Standard linear solid model
