= Upper-convected time derivative =

Physics term

In continuum mechanics, including fluid dynamics, an upper-convected time derivative or Oldroyd derivative, named after James G. Oldroyd, is the rate of change of some tensor property of a small parcel of fluid that is written in the coordinate system rotating and stretching with the fluid.

The operator is specified by the following formula:

$$\stackrel{\triangledown}{\mathbf{A}} = \frac{D}{Dt} \mathbf{A} - (\nabla \mathbf{v})^T \cdot \mathbf{A} - \mathbf{A} \cdot (\nabla \mathbf{v})$$

where:

- ${\stackrel{\triangledown}{\mathbf A}}$ is the upper-convected time derivative of a tensor field $\mathbf{A}$
- $\frac{D}{Dt}$ is the substantive derivative
- $\nabla \mathbf{v}=\frac {\partial v_j}{\partial x_i}$ is the tensor of velocity derivatives for the fluid.

The formula can be rewritten as:

$${\stackrel{\triangledown}{A}}_{i,j} = \frac {\partial A_{i,j}} {\partial t} + v_k \frac {\partial A_{i,j}} {\partial x_k} - \frac {\partial v_i} {\partial x_k} A_{k,j} - \frac {\partial v_j} {\partial x_k} A_{i,k}$$

By definition, the upper-convected time derivative of the Finger tensor is always zero.

It can be shown that the upper-convected time derivative of a spacelike vector field is just its Lie derivative by the velocity field of the continuum.

The upper-convected derivative is widely used in polymer rheology for the description of the behavior of a viscoelastic fluid under large deformations.

== Notation ==
The form the equation is written in is not entirely clear due to different definitions for $\nabla \mathbf{v}$. This term can be found defined as $(\nabla \mathbf{v})_{ij}=\frac {\partial v_j}{\partial x_i}$ or its transpose (for example see Strain-rate tensor containing both). Changing this definition only necessitates changes in transpose operations and is thus largely inconsequential and can be done as long as one stays consistent. The notation used here is picked to be consistent with the literature using the upper-convected derivative.

== Examples for the symmetric tensor A ==
=== Simple shear ===
For the case of simple shear:

$$\nabla \mathbf{v} = \begin{pmatrix} 0 & {\dot \gamma} & 0 \\ 0 & 0 & 0 \\ 0 & 0 & 0 \end{pmatrix}$$

Thus,

$$\stackrel{\triangledown}{\mathbf A} = \frac{D}{Dt} \mathbf{A}-\dot \gamma \begin{pmatrix} 2 A_{12} & A_{22} & A_{23} \\ A_{22} & 0 & 0 \\ A_{23} & 0 & 0 \end{pmatrix}$$

=== Uniaxial extension of incompressible fluid ===
In this case a material is stretched in the direction X and compresses in the directions Y and Z, so to keep volume constant. The gradients of velocity are:

$$\nabla \mathbf{v} = \begin{pmatrix} \dot \epsilon & 0 & 0 \\ 0 & -\frac {\dot \epsilon} {2} & 0 \\ 0 & 0 & -\frac{\dot \epsilon} 2 \end{pmatrix}$$

Thus,

$$\stackrel{\triangledown}{\mathbf A} = \frac{D}{Dt} \mathbf{A}-\frac {\dot \epsilon} 2 \begin{pmatrix} 4A_{11} & A_{21} & A_{31} \\ A_{12} & -2A_{22} & -2A_{23} \\ A_{13} & -2A_{23} & -2A_{33} \end{pmatrix}$$

== See also ==
- Upper-convected Maxwell model
- Objective stress rate
