= Maxwellian =

- Maxwell–Boltzmann distribution
- The Maxwellians (1991 book)

== See also ==
- List of things named after James Clerk Maxwell
