= Upper-convected Maxwell model =

Class of constitutive equations for viscoelastic fluids

The upper-convected Maxwell (UCM) model is a generalisation of the Maxwell material for the case of large deformations using the upper-convected time derivative. The model was proposed by James G. Oldroyd. The concept is named after James Clerk Maxwell. It is the simplest observer independent constitutive equation for viscoelasticity and further is able to reproduce first normal stresses. Thus, it constitutes one of the most fundamental models for rheology.

The model can be written as:

$$\mathbf{T} + \lambda \stackrel{\nabla}{\mathbf{T}} = 2\eta_0 \mathbf {D}$$

where:

- $\mathbf{T}$ is the stress tensor;
- $\lambda$ is the relaxation time;
- $\stackrel{\nabla}{\mathbf{T}}$ is the upper-convected time derivative of stress tensor:

$$\stackrel{\nabla}{\mathbf{T}} = \frac{\partial}{\partial t} \mathbf{T} + \mathbf{v} \cdot \nabla \mathbf{T} - (\nabla \mathbf{v})^T \cdot \mathbf{T} - \mathbf{T} \cdot (\nabla \mathbf{v})$$

- $\mathbf{v}$ is the fluid velocity and the gradient of a vector follows the convention $(\nabla{\mathbf{v}})_{ij} = \partial_i v_j$.
- $\eta_0$ is material viscosity at steady simple shear;
- $\mathbf {D}$ is the deformation rate tensor.

The model can be derived either by applying the concept of observer invariance to the Maxwell material or by two different mesoscopic models, namely Hookean Dumbells or Temporary Networks. Even though both microscopic model lead to the upper evolution equation for the stress, recent work pointed up the differences when accounting also for the stress fluctuations.

== Case of the steady shear ==
For this case only two components of the shear stress became non-zero:

$$T_{12}=\eta_0 \dot \gamma \,$$

and

$$T_{11}=2 \eta_0 \lambda {\dot \gamma}^2 \,$$

where $\dot \gamma$ is the shear rate.

Thus, the upper-convected Maxwell model predicts for the simple shear that shear stress to be proportional to the shear rate and the first difference of normal stresses ($T_{11}-T_{22}$) is proportional to the square of the shear rate, the second difference of normal stresses ($T_{22}-T_{33}$) is always zero. In other words, UCM predicts appearance of the first difference of normal stresses but does not predict non-Newtonian behavior of the shear viscosity nor the second difference of the normal stresses.

Usually quadratic behavior of the first difference of normal stresses and no second difference of the normal stresses is a realistic behavior of polymer melts at moderated shear rates, but constant viscosity is unrealistic and limits usability of the model.

== Case of start-up of steady shear ==
For this case only two components of the shear stress became non-zero:

$$T_{12}=\eta_0 \dot \gamma \left(1-\exp\left(-\frac t \lambda\right)\right)$$

and

$$T_{11}=2 \eta_0 \lambda {\dot \gamma}^2 \left(1 -\exp\left(-\frac t \lambda\right)\left(1+\frac t \lambda \right)\right)$$

The equations above describe stresses gradually risen from zero the steady-state values. The equation is only applicable, when the velocity profile in the shear flow is fully developed. Then the shear rate is constant over the channel height. If the start-up form a zero velocity distribution has to be calculated, the full set of PDEs has to be solved.

== Case of the steady state uniaxial extension or uniaxial compression ==
For this case UCM predicts the normal stresses $\sigma=T_{11}-T_{22}=T_{11}-T_{33}$ calculated by the following equation:

$$\sigma=\frac {2 \eta_0 \dot \epsilon} {1-2\lambda \dot \epsilon} + \frac {\eta_0 \dot \epsilon} {1+ \lambda \dot \epsilon}$$

where $\dot \epsilon$ is the elongation rate.

The equation predicts the elongation viscosity approaching $3 \eta_0$ (the same as for the Newtonian fluids) for the case of low elongation rate ( $\dot \epsilon \ll \frac 1 \lambda$) with fast deformation thickening with the steady state viscosity approaching infinity at some elongational rate ($\dot \epsilon_\infty = \frac 1 {2 \lambda}$) and at some compression rate ($\dot \epsilon_{-\infty} = -\frac 1 {\lambda}$). This behavior seems to be realistic.

== Case of small deformation ==
For the case of small deformation the nonlinearities introduced by the upper-convected derivative disappear and the model becomes an ordinary model of Maxwell material.
