= Stress relaxation =

Materials science phenomenon

In materials science, stress relaxation is the observed decrease in stress in response to strain generated in the structure. This is primarily due to keeping the structure in a strained condition for some finite interval of time hence causing some amount of plastic strain. This should not be confused with creep, which is a constant state of stress with an increasing amount of strain.

Since relaxation relieves the state of stress, it has the effect of also relieving the equipment reactions. Thus, relaxation has the same effect as cold springing, except it occurs over a longer period of time. The amount of relaxation which takes place is a function of time, temperature and stress level, thus the actual effect it has on the system is not precisely known, but can be bounded.

Stress relaxation describes how polymers relieve stress under constant strain. Because they are viscoelastic, polymers behave in a nonlinear, non-Hookean fashion. This nonlinearity is described by both stress relaxation and a phenomenon known as creep, which describes how polymers strain under constant stress. Experimentally, stress relaxation is determined by step strain experiments, i.e. by applying a sudden one-time strain and measuring the build-up and subsequent relaxation of stress in the material (see figure), in either extensional or shear rheology.

a) Applied step strain and b) induced stress as functions of time for a viscoelastic material.

Viscoelastic materials have the properties of both viscous and elastic materials and can be modeled by combining elements that represent these characteristics. One viscoelastic model, called the Maxwell model predicts behavior akin to a spring (elastic element) being in series with a dashpot (viscous element), while the Voigt model places these elements in parallel. Although the Maxwell model is good at predicting stress relaxation, it is fairly poor at predicting creep. On the other hand, the Voigt model is good at predicting creep but rather poor at predicting stress relaxation (see viscoelasticity).

The extracellular matrix and most tissues are stress relaxing, and the kinetics of stress relaxation have been recognized as an important mechanical cue that affects the migration, proliferation, and differentiation of embedded cells.

Stress relaxation calculations can differ for different materials:

To generalize, Obukhov uses power dependencies:

$$\sigma(t)= \frac { \sigma_0 }{ 1-[1-(t/t^*)(1^{1-n})]}$$

where $\sigma_0$ is the maximum stress at the time the loading was removed (t*), and n is a material parameter.

Vegener et al. use a power series to describe stress relaxation in polyamides:

$\sigma(t)= \sum_{m,n}^{} { A_{mn} [\ln(1+t)]^m (\epsilon'_0)^n}$

To model stress relaxation in glass materials Dowvalter uses the following:

$\sigma(t) = \frac { 1 }{ b }\cdot \log {\frac{10^{\alpha}(t-t_n)+1}{10^{\alpha}(t-t_n)-1}}$ where $\alpha$ is a material constant and b and $t_n$ depend on processing conditions.

The following non-material parameters all affect stress relaxation in polymers:

- Magnitude of initial loading
- Speed of loading
- Temperature (isothermal vs non-isothermal conditions)
- Loading medium
- Friction and wear
- Long-term storage

== See also ==
- Creep
- Viscoelasticity
- Standard Linear Solid Model
- Burgers material
- Maxwell material
- Kelvin–Voigt material
