= James G. Oldroyd =

British mathematician (1921-1982)

James Gardner Oldroyd (25 April 1921 – 22 November 1982) was a British mathematician and noted rheologist. He formulated the Oldroyd-B model to describe the viscoelastic behaviour of non-Newtonian fluids.

== Life ==
Oldroyd was born in 1921 and educated at Bradford Grammar School, and Trinity College, Cambridge. On graduation, during the Second World War, he worked for the Ministry of Supply. After the war he joined the Research Laboratory of Courtaulds. In 1946 he married Marged Katryn Evans. In 1953 he became professor of mathematics at the University of Wales, Swansea until 1965 and head of the Applied Mathematics department from 1957. In 1965 he moved to Liverpool University, becoming head of the Department of Applied Mathematics and Theoretical Physics in 1973 until his death. He died 22 November 1982, and was survived by his wife Katryn and three sons.

== Work ==
In 1950 he published a paper "On the Formulation of Rheological Equations of State" which has been described as "probably the most important single paper in theoretical rheology" as it established the basic requirements for mathematical models of rheology. For this and other major papers he received international recognition, including the Gold Medal of the British Society of Rheology, and a tribute issue of its Bulletin on his sixtieth birthday.
