= Dynamic modulus =

Ratio used in material engineering

Dynamic modulus (sometimes complex modulus) is the ratio of stress to strain under vibratory conditions (calculated from data obtained from either free or forced vibration tests, in shear, compression, or elongation). It is a property of viscoelastic materials.

== Viscoelastic stress–strain phase-lag ==
Viscoelasticity is studied using dynamic mechanical analysis where an oscillatory force (stress) is applied to a material and the resulting displacement (strain) is measured.

- In purely elastic materials the stress and strain occur in phase, so that the response of one occurs simultaneously with the other.
- In purely viscous materials, there is a phase difference between stress and strain, where strain lags stress by a 90 degree ($\pi/2$ radian) phase lag.
- Viscoelastic materials exhibit behavior somewhere in between that of purely viscous and purely elastic materials, exhibiting some phase lag in strain.

Stress and strain in a viscoelastic material can be represented using the following expressions:

- Strain: $\varepsilon = \varepsilon_0 \sin(\omega t)$
- Stress: $\sigma = \sigma_0 \sin(\omega t+ \delta) \,$

where

$\omega =2 \pi f$ where $f$ is frequency of strain oscillation,
$t$ is time,
$\delta$ is phase lag between stress and strain.

The stress relaxation modulus $G\left(t\right)$ is the ratio of the stress remaining at time $t$ after a step strain $\varepsilon$ was applied at time $t=0$: $G\left(t\right) = \frac{\sigma\left(t\right)}{\varepsilon}$,

which is the time-dependent generalization of Hooke's law. For visco-elastic solids, $G\left(t\right)$ converges to the equilibrium shear modulus$G$:

$$G=\lim_{t\to \infty} G(t)$$.

The Fourier transform of the shear relaxation modulus $G(t)$ is $\hat{G}(\omega)=\hat{G}'(\omega) +i\hat{G}''(\omega)$ (see below).

=== Storage and loss modulus ===
The storage and loss modulus in viscoelastic materials measure the stored energy, representing the elastic portion, and the energy dissipated as heat, representing the viscous portion. The tensile storage and loss moduli are defined as follows:

- Storage: $E' = \frac {\sigma_0} {\varepsilon_0} \cos \delta$
- Loss: $E'' = \frac {\sigma_0} {\varepsilon_0} \sin \delta$

Similarly we also define shear storage and shear loss moduli, $G'$ and $G''$.

Complex variables can be used to express the moduli $E^*$ and $G^*$ as follows:

$$E^* = E' + iE'' \,$$
$G^* = G' + iG'' \,$

where $i$ is the imaginary unit.

=== Ratio between loss and storage modulus ===
The ratio of the loss modulus to storage modulus in a viscoelastic material is defined as the $\tan \delta$, (cf. loss tangent), which provides a measure of damping in the material. $\tan \delta$ can also be visualized as the tangent of the phase angle ($\delta$) between the storage and loss modulus.

Tensile: $\tan \delta = \frac {E''} {E'}$

Shear: $\tan \delta = \frac {G''} {G'}$

For a material with a $\tan \delta$ greater than 1, the energy-dissipating, viscous component of the complex modulus prevails.

== See also ==
- Dynamic mechanical analysis
- Elastic modulus
- Palierne equation
