= Relaxation (physics) =

Return of a perturbed system into equilibrium

In the physical sciences, relaxation usually means the return of a perturbed system into equilibrium. Each relaxation process can be categorized by a relaxation time τ. The simplest theoretical description of relaxation as function of time t is an exponential law exp(−t/τ) (exponential decay).

== In simple linear systems ==
=== Mechanics: Damped unforced oscillator ===
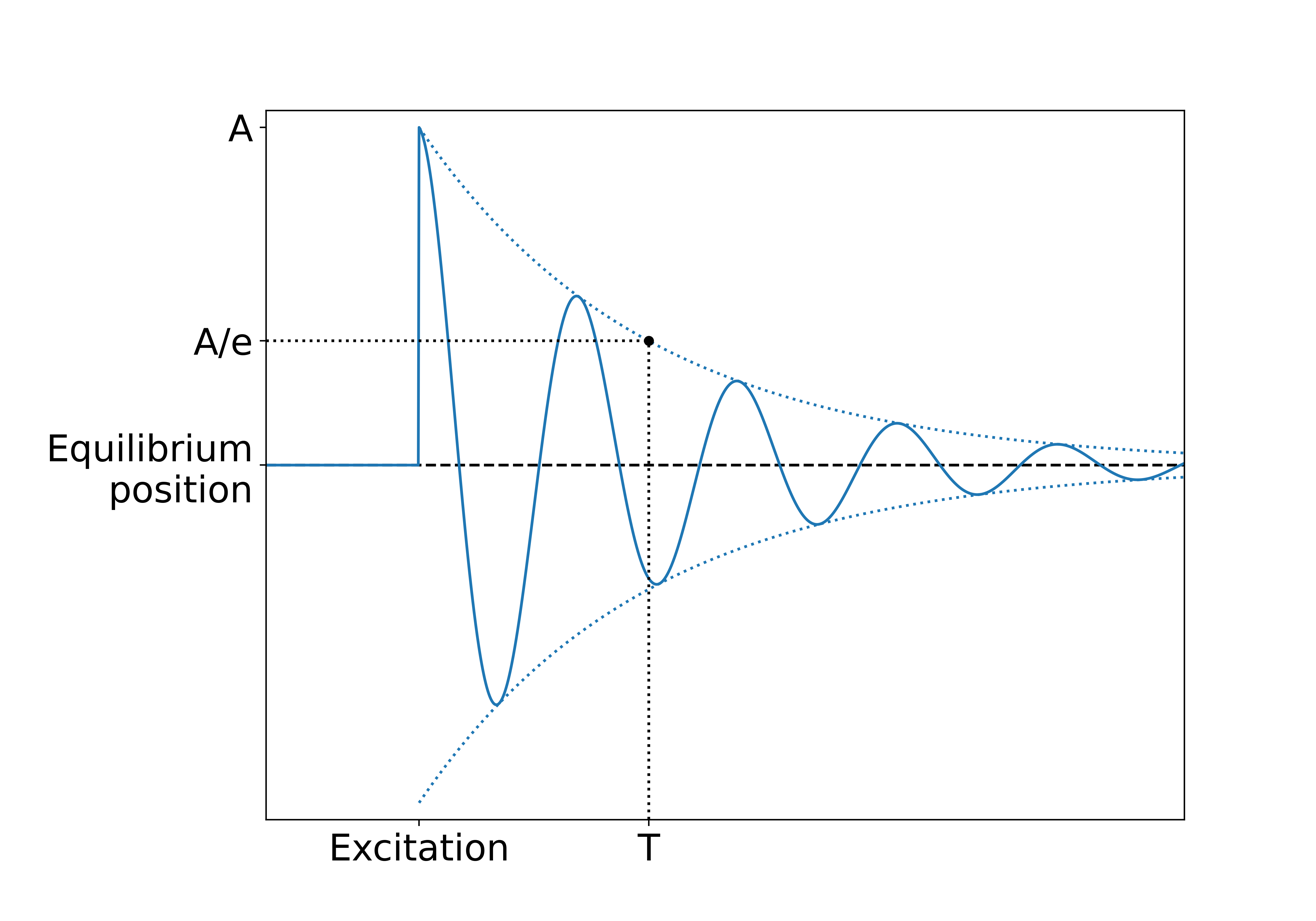
The displacement of a damped unforced harmonic oscillator over time. It is excited at some time and then allowed to relax back to its equilibrium position over time.

Let the homogeneous differential equation:

$$m\frac{d^2 y}{d t^2}+\gamma\frac{d y}{d t}+ky=0$$

model damped unforced oscillations of a weight on a spring.

The displacement will then be of the form $y(t) = A e^{-t/T} \cos(\mu t - \delta)$. The constant T ($=2m/\gamma$) is called the relaxation time of the system and the constant μ is the quasi-frequency.

=== Electronics: RC circuit ===
In an RC circuit containing a charged capacitor and a resistor, the voltage decays exponentially:

$$V(t)=V_0 e^{-\frac{t}{RC}} \ ,$$

The constant $\tau = RC\$ is called the relaxation time or RC time constant of the circuit. A nonlinear oscillator circuit which generates a repeating waveform by the repetitive discharge of a capacitor through a resistance is called a relaxation oscillator.

== In condensed matter physics ==
In condensed matter physics, relaxation is usually studied as a linear response to a small external perturbation. Since the underlying microscopic processes are active even in the absence of external perturbations, one can also study "relaxation in equilibrium" instead of the usual "relaxation into equilibrium" (see fluctuation-dissipation theorem).

=== Stress relaxation ===
In continuum mechanics, stress relaxation is the gradual disappearance of stresses from a viscoelastic medium after it has been deformed.

=== Dielectric relaxation time ===
In dielectric materials, the dielectric polarization P depends on the electric field E. If E changes, P(t) reacts: the polarization relaxes towards a new equilibrium, i.e., the surface charges equalize. It is important in dielectric spectroscopy. Very long relaxation times are responsible for dielectric absorption.

The dielectric relaxation time is closely related to the electrical conductivity. In a semiconductor it is a measure of how long it takes to become neutralized by conduction process. This relaxation time is small in metals and can be large in semiconductors and insulators.

=== Liquids and amorphous solids ===
An amorphous solid such as amorphous indomethacin displays a temperature dependence of molecular motion, which can be quantified as the average relaxation time for the solid in a metastable supercooled liquid or glass to approach the molecular motion characteristic of a crystal. Differential scanning calorimetry can be used to quantify enthalpy change due to molecular structural relaxation.

The term "structural relaxation" was introduced in the scientific literature in 1947/48 without any explanation, applied to NMR, and meaning the same as "thermal relaxation".

=== Spin relaxation in NMR ===
In nuclear magnetic resonance (NMR), various relaxations are the properties that it measures.

== Chemical relaxation methods ==
In chemical kinetics, relaxation methods are used for the measurement of very fast reaction rates. A system initially at equilibrium is perturbed by a rapid change in a parameter such as the temperature (most commonly), the pressure, the electric field or the pH of the solvent. The return to equilibrium is then observed, usually by spectroscopic means, and the relaxation time measured. In combination with the chemical equilibrium constant of the system, this enables the determination of the rate constants for the forward and reverse reactions.

=== Monomolecular first-order reversible reaction ===
A monomolecular, first order reversible reaction which is close to equilibrium can be visualized by the following symbolic structure:
$$\ce{A} ~ \overset{k}{\rightarrow} ~ \ce{B} ~ \overset{k'}{\rightarrow} ~ \ce{A}$$
$$\ce{A <=> B}$$

In other words, reactant A and product B are forming into one another based on reaction rate constants k and k'.

To solve for the concentration of A, recognize that the forward reaction ($\ce{A ->[{k}] B}$) causes the concentration of A to decrease over time, whereas the reverse reaction ($\ce{B ->[{k'}] A}$) causes the concentration of A to increase over time.

Therefore, ${d\ce{[A]} \over dt} = -k\ce{[A]}+k'\ce{[B]}$, where brackets around A and B indicate concentrations.

If we say that at $t = 0, \ce{[A]}(t) = \ce{[A]}_0$, and applying the law of conservation of mass, we can say that at any time, the sum of the concentrations of A and B must be equal to the concentration of $A_0$, assuming the volume into which A and B are dissolved does not change:
$$\ce{[A]} + \ce{[B]} = \ce{[A]}_0 \Rightarrow \ce{[B]} = \ce{[A]}_0 - \ce{[A]}$$

Substituting this value for [B] in terms of [A]_{0} and [A](t) yields
$${d\ce{[A]} \over dt} = -k\ce{[A]} + k'\ce{[B]} = -k\ce{[A]}+k'(\ce{[A]}_0-\ce{[A]}) = -(k + k')\ce{[A]} + k'\ce{[A]}_0,$$
which becomes the separable differential equation
$$\frac{d\ce{[A]}}{-(k + k') \ce{[A]} + k'\ce{[A]}_0} = dt$$

This equation can be solved by substitution to yield
$$\ce{[A]} = {k'-ke^{-(k+k')t} \over k+k'} \ce{[A]}_0$$

== In atmospheric sciences ==
=== Desaturation of clouds ===
Consider a supersaturated portion of a cloud. Then shut off the updrafts, entrainment, and any other vapor sources/sinks and things that would induce the growth of the particles (ice or water). Then wait for this supersaturation to reduce and become just saturation (relative humidity = 100%), which is the equilibrium state. The time it takes for the supersaturation to dissipate is called relaxation time. It will happen as ice crystals or liquid water content grow within the cloud and will thus consume the contained moisture. The dynamics of relaxation are very important in cloud physics for accurate mathematical modelling.

In water clouds where the concentrations are larger (hundreds per cm^{3}) and the temperatures are warmer (thus allowing for much lower supersaturation rates as compared to ice clouds), the relaxation times will be very low (seconds to minutes).

In ice clouds the concentrations are lower (just a few per liter) and the temperatures are colder (very high supersaturation rates) and so the relaxation times can be as long as several hours. Relaxation time is given as

T = (4π DNRK)^{−1} seconds,

where:

- D = diffusion coefficient [m^{2}/s]
- N = concentration (of ice crystals or water droplets) [m^{−3}]
- R = mean radius of particles [m]
- K = capacitance [unitless].

== In astronomy ==
In astronomy, relaxation time relates to clusters of gravitationally interacting bodies, for instance, stars in a galaxy. The relaxation time is a measure of the time it takes for one object in the system (the "test star") to be significantly perturbed by other objects in the system (the "field stars"). It is most commonly defined as the time for the test star's velocity to change by of order itself.

Suppose that the test star has velocity v. As the star moves along its orbit, its motion will be randomly perturbed by the gravitational field of nearby stars. The relaxation time can be shown to be

$$\begin{align}
T_r &= {0.34\sigma^3\over G^2 m\rho\ln\Lambda} \\
&\approx
0.95\times 10^{10} \!\left({\sigma\over 200\,\mathrm{km\,s}^{-1}}\right)^{\!3} \!\!\left({\rho\over 10^6\,M_\odot\,\mathrm{pc}^{-3}}\right)^{\!-1} \!\!\left({m\over M_\odot}\right)^{\!-1} \!\!\left({\ln\Lambda\over 15}\right)^{\!-1}\!\mathrm{yr}
\end{align}$$

where ρ is the mean density, m is the test-star mass, σ is the 1d velocity dispersion of the field stars, and ln Λ is the Coulomb logarithm.

Various events occur on timescales relating to the relaxation time, including core collapse, energy equipartition, and formation of a Bahcall-Wolf cusp around a supermassive black hole.

== See also ==
- Relaxation oscillator
- Time constant
