= Characterization (materials science) =

Study of material structure and properties

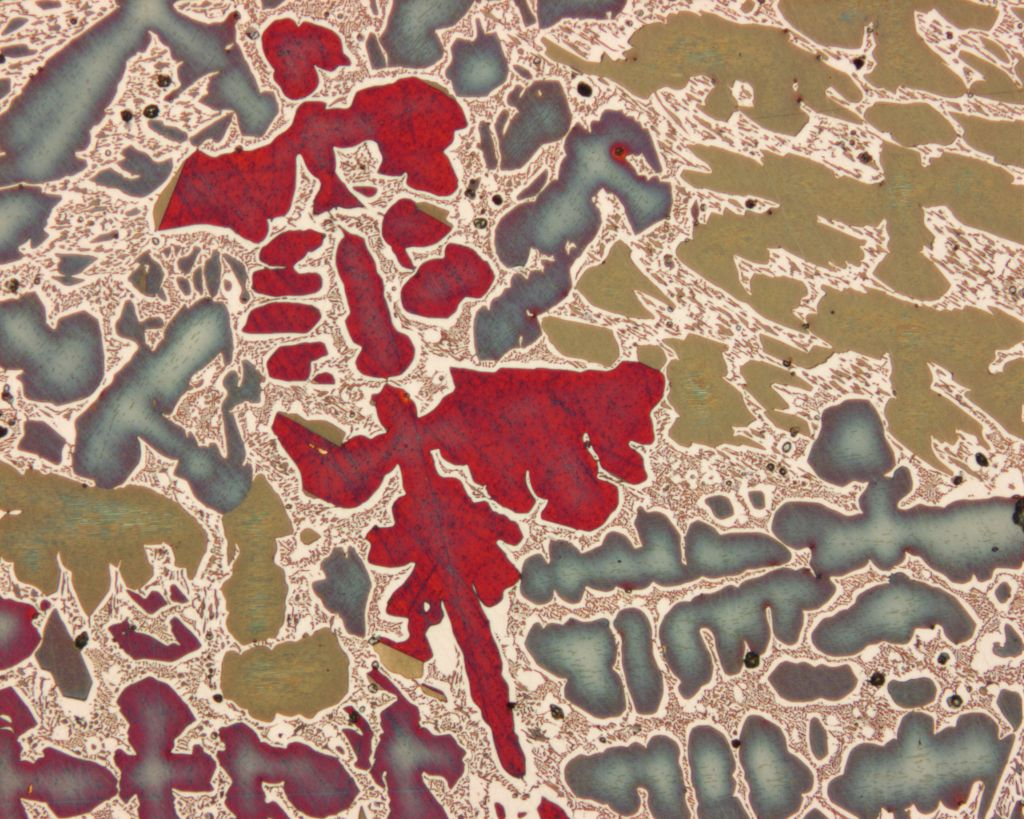
The characterization technique optical microscopy showing the micron scale dendritic microstructure of a bronze alloy

Characterization in materials science is the broad and general process by which a material's structure and properties are probed and measured. It is a fundamental process in the field of materials science, without which no scientific understanding of engineering materials could be ascertained. The scope of the term often differs; some definitions limit the term's use to techniques which study the microscopic structure and properties of materials, while others use the term to refer to any materials analysis process including macroscopic techniques such as mechanical testing, thermal analysis and density calculation. The scale of the structures observed in materials characterization ranges from angstroms, such as in the imaging of individual atoms and chemical bonds, up to centimeters, such as in the imaging of coarse grain structures in metals.

While many characterization techniques have been practiced for centuries, such as basic optical microscopy, new techniques and methodologies are constantly emerging. In particular the advent of the electron microscope and secondary ion mass spectrometry in the 20th century has revolutionized the field, allowing the imaging and analysis of structures and compositions on much smaller scales than was previously possible, leading to a huge increase in the level of understanding as to why different materials show different properties and behaviors. More recently, atomic force microscopy has further increased the maximum possible resolution for analysis of certain samples in the last 30 years.

== Microscopy ==
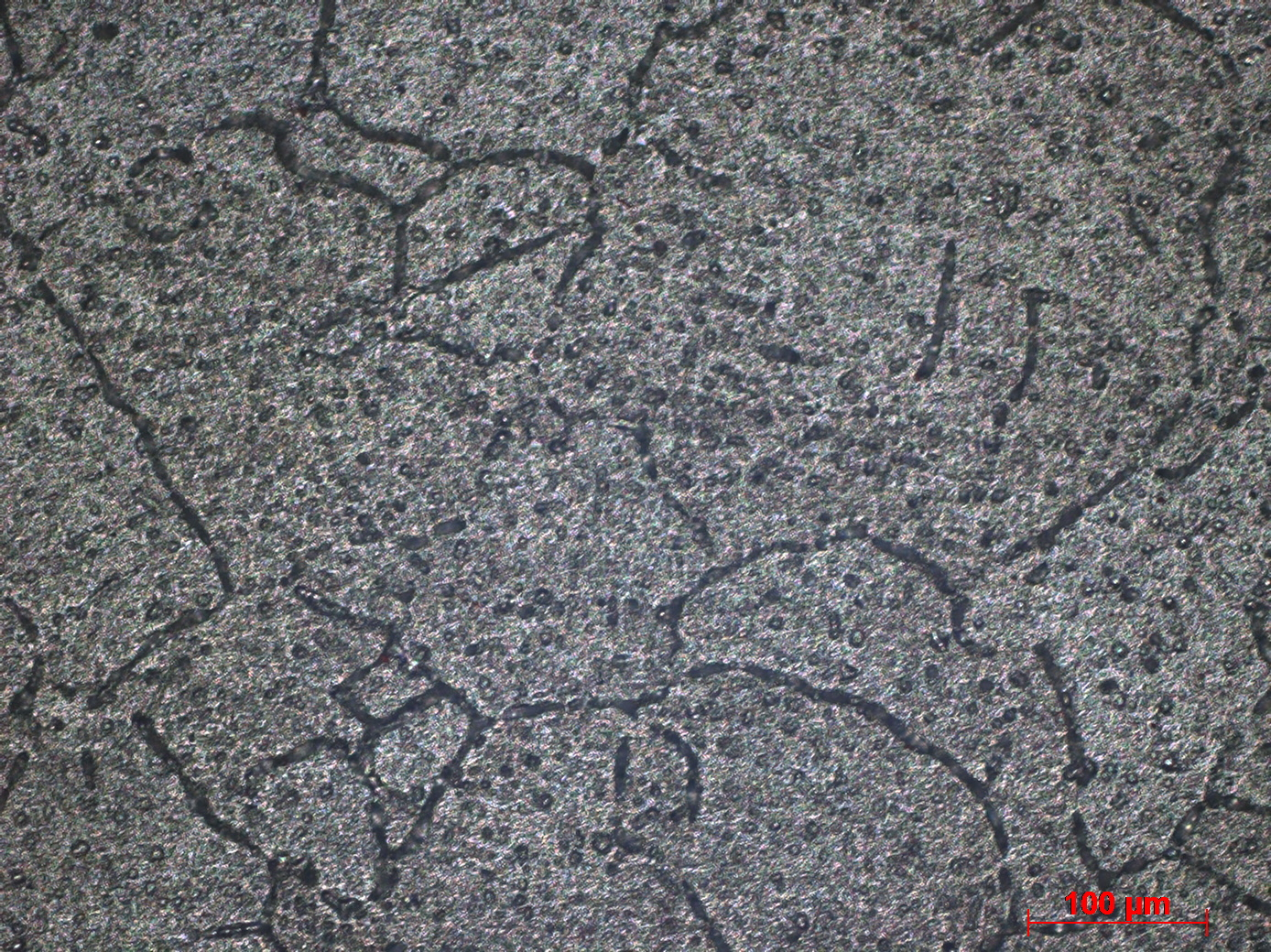
Optical microscopy image of aluminium

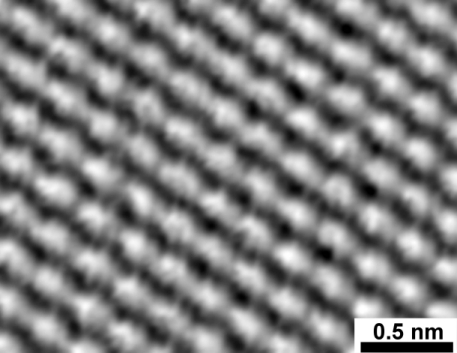
Image of a graphite surface at an atomic level obtained by an STM

Microscopy is a category of characterization techniques which probe and map the surface and sub-surface structure of a material. These techniques can use photons, electrons, ions or physical cantilever probes to gather data about a sample's structure on a range of length scales. Some common examples of microscopy techniques include:

- Optical microscopy
- Scanning electron microscopy (SEM)
- Transmission electron microscopy (TEM)
- Field ion microscopy (FIM)
- Scanning probe microscopy (SPM)
  - Atomic force microscopy (AFM)
  - Scanning tunneling microscopy (STM)
- X-ray diffraction topography (XRT)
- Atom-Probe Tomography (APT)

== Spectroscopy ==
Spectroscopy is a category of characterization techniques which use a range of principles to reveal the chemical composition, composition variation, crystal structure and photoelectric properties of materials. Some common examples of spectroscopy techniques include:

=== Optical radiation ===
- Ultraviolet-visible spectroscopy (UV-vis)
- Fourier transform infrared spectroscopy (FTIR)
- Thermoluminescence (TL)
- Photoluminescence (PL)

=== X-ray ===
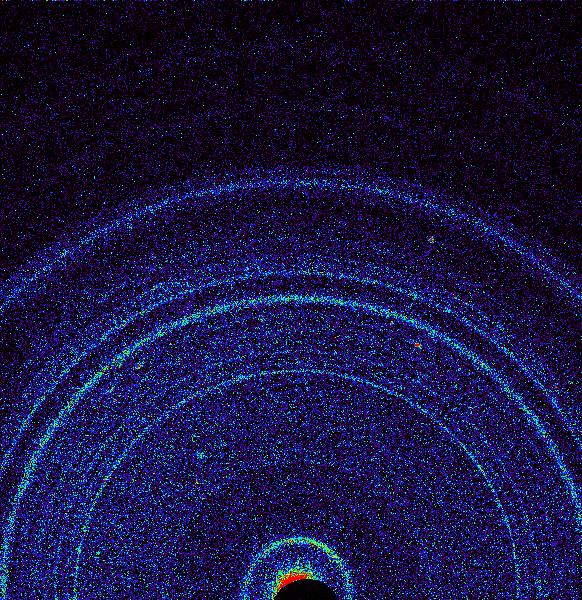
First X-ray diffraction view of Martian soil - CheMin analysis reveals feldspar, pyroxenes, olivine and more (Curiosity rover at "Rocknest", October 17, 2012).

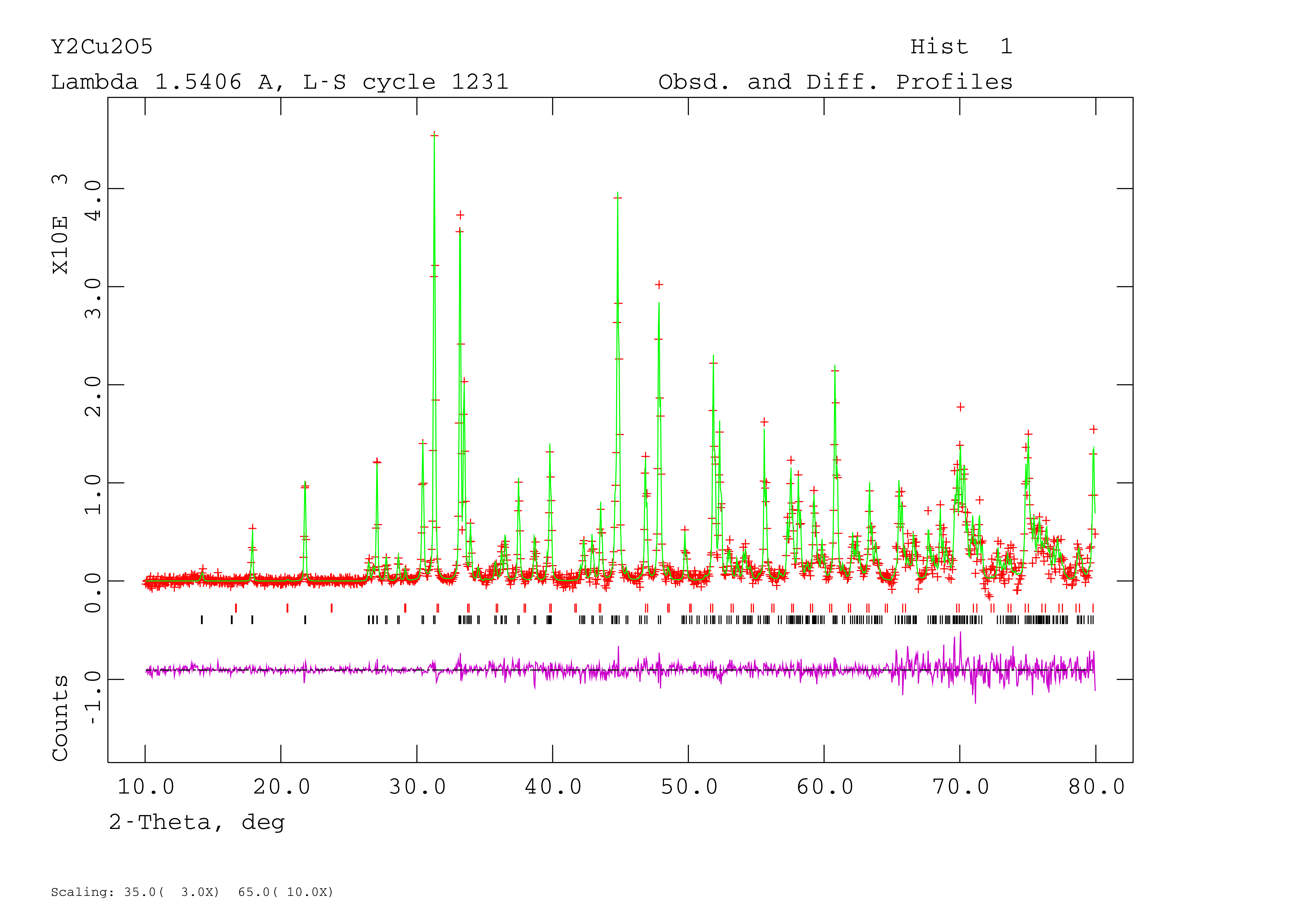
X-ray powder diffraction of Y_{2}Cu_{2}O_{5} and Rietveld refinement with two phases, showing 1% of yttrium oxide impurity (red tickers)

- X-ray diffraction (XRD)
- Small-angle X-ray scattering (SAXS)
- Energy-dispersive X-ray spectroscopy (EDX, EDS)
- Wavelength dispersive X-ray spectroscopy (WDX, WDS)
- Electron energy loss spectroscopy (EELS)
- X-ray photoelectron spectroscopy (XPS)
- Auger electron spectroscopy (AES)
- X-ray photon correlation spectroscopy (XPCS)

=== Mass spectrometry ===
- Modes of mass spectrometry:
  - Electron ionization (EI)
  - Thermal ionization mass spectrometry (TI-MS)
  - MALDI-TOF
- Secondary ion mass spectrometry (SIMS)

=== Nuclear spectroscopy ===
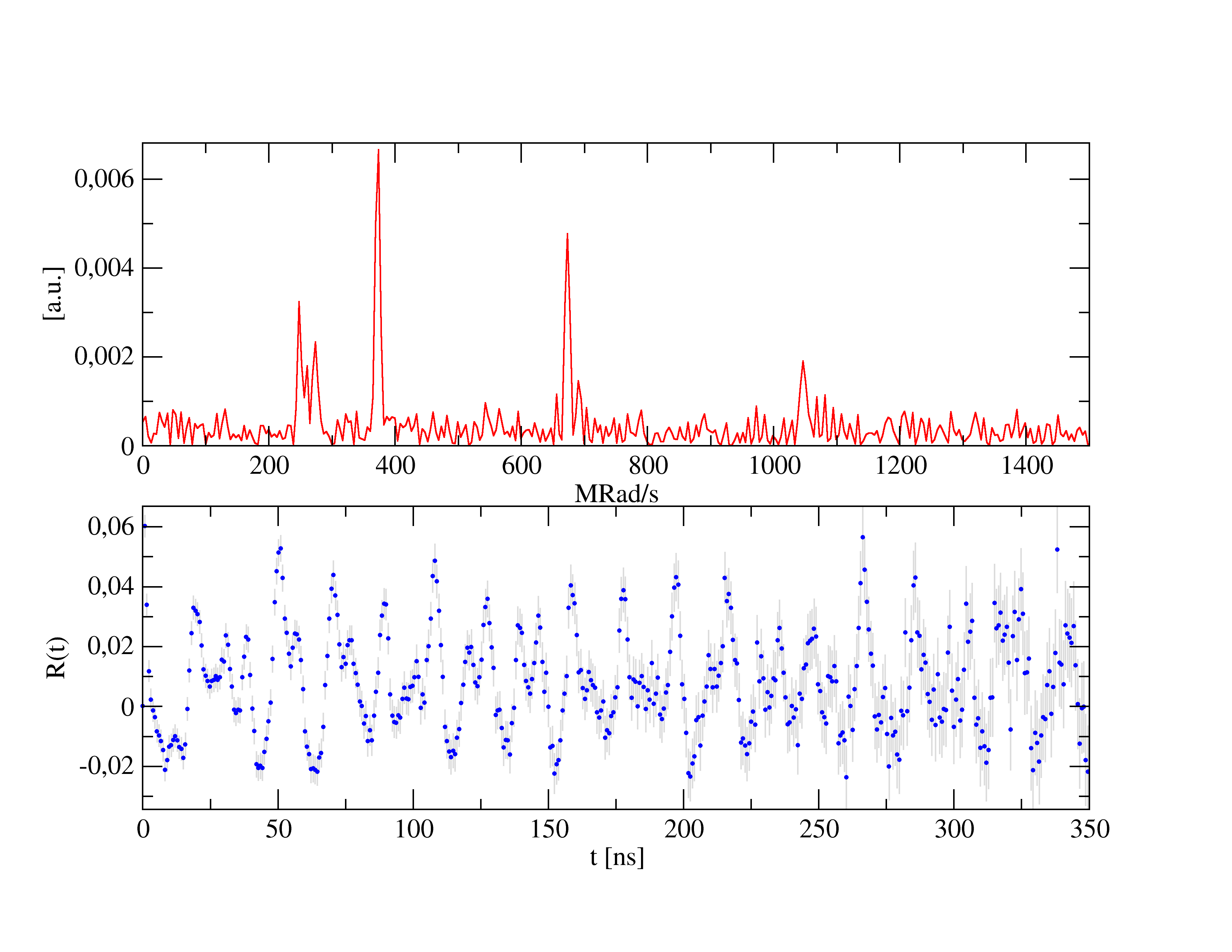
PAC probing the local structure by using radioactive nuclei. From the pattern, electric field gradients are obtained that resolve the structure around the radioactive atom, in order to study phase transitions, defects, diffusion.

- Nuclear magnetic resonance spectroscopy (NMR)
- Mössbauer spectroscopy (MBS)
- Perturbed angular correlation (PAC)

=== Other ===
- Photon correlation spectroscopy/Dynamic light scattering (DLS)
- Terahertz spectroscopy (THz)
- Electron paramagnetic/spin resonance (EPR, ESR)
- Small-angle neutron scattering (SANS)
- Rutherford backscattering spectrometry (RBS)
- Spatially resolved acoustic spectroscopy (SRAS)

== Macroscopic testing ==
A huge range of techniques are used to characterize various macroscopic properties of materials, including:

- Mechanical testing, including tensile, compressive, torsional, creep, fatigue, toughness and hardness testing
- Differential thermal analysis (DTA)
- Dielectric thermal analysis (DEA, DETA)
- Thermogravimetric analysis (TGA)
- Differential scanning calorimetry (DSC)
- Impulse excitation technique (IET)
- Ultrasound techniques, including resonant ultrasound spectroscopy and time domain ultrasonic testing methods

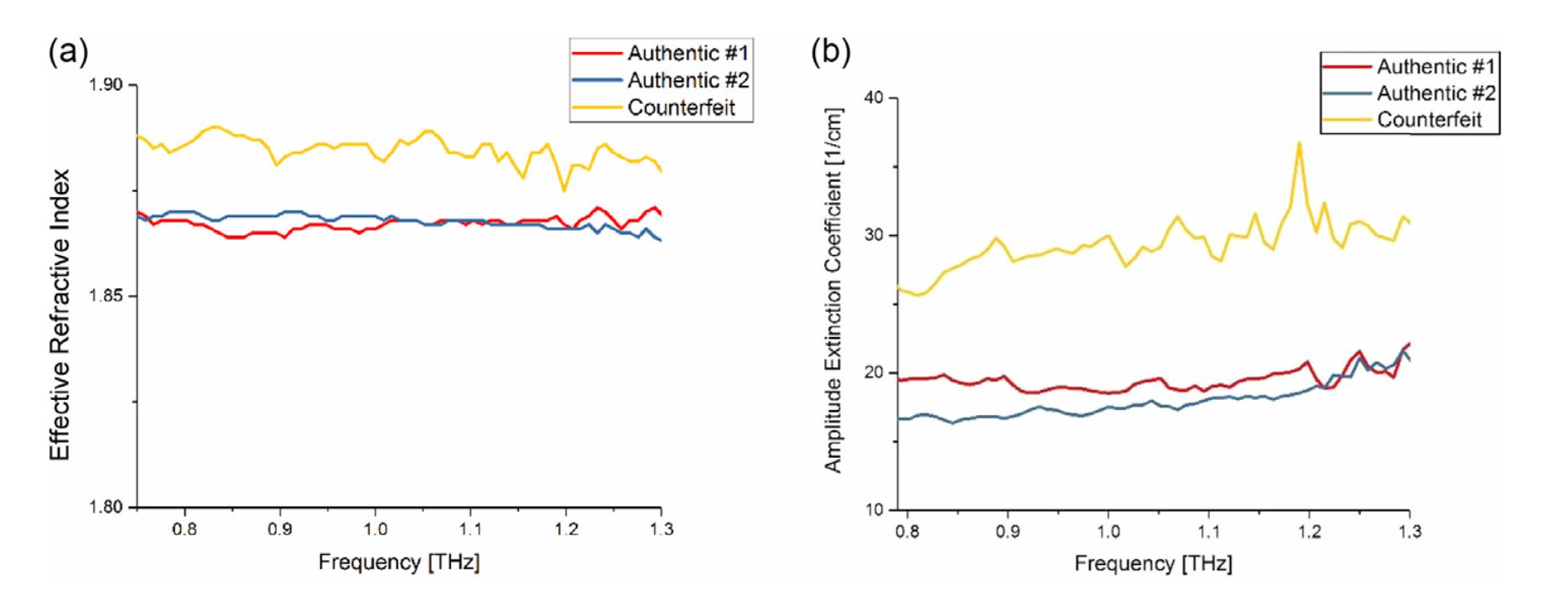
(a) effective refractive indexes and (b) absorption coefficients of integrated circuits obtained via terahertz spectroscopy

== See also ==
- Analytical chemistry
- Instrumental chemistry
- Semiconductor characterization techniques
- Wafer bond characterization
- Polymer characterization
- Lipid bilayer characterization
- Lignin characterization
- Characterization of nanoparticles
- MEMS for in situ mechanical characterization
