= Broadband viscoelastic spectroscopy =

Broadband viscoelastic spectroscopy (BVS) is a technique for studying viscoelastic solids in both bending and torsion. It provides the ability to measure viscoelastic behavior over eleven decades (orders of magnitude) of time and frequency: from 10^{−6} to 10^{5} Hz. BVS is typically either used to investigate viscoelastic properties isothermally over a large frequency range or as a function of temperature at a single frequency. It is capable of measuring mechanical properties directly over these frequency and temperature ranges; as such, it does not require time-temperature superposition or the assumption that material properties obey an Arrhenius-type temperature dependence. As a result, it can be used for heterogeneous and anisotropic specimens for which these assumptions do not apply. BVS is often used for the determination of attenuation coefficients, dynamic moduli, and especially damping ratios.

BVS was developed primarily to overcome shortcomings in the functional ranges of other viscoelastic characterization techniques. For example, resonant ultrasound spectroscopy (RUS), another popular technique for studying viscoelastic solids, experiences difficulty in determining a material's parameters below its resonant frequency. Furthermore, BVS is less sensitive to sample preparation than RUS.

== History ==
BVS was first developed by C. P. Chen and R. S. Lakes in 1989 in order to address the shortcomings of existing laboratory techniques for studying viscoelastic materials. It was later refined by M. Brodt et al. to improve the rigidity and resolution of the apparatus, which were sources of error in the original design. First used to study poly(methyl methacrylate) (PMMA), it has since seen applications in determining the properties of bone, capacitor dielectrics, high damping metals, and other such viscoelastic materials.

== Design ==
The BVS apparatus consists of a specimen surrounded by Helmholtz coils and isolated from external vibrations by a framework constructed from insulating foam and either lead or brass. The specimen is affixed with both a permanent magnet and a mirror. The orientation of the coils with respect to the magnet when a current is driven through them determines whether the specimen undergoes bending or torsion. Angular displacement of the specimen is measured by an interferometer that detects the spatial movement of a reflected laser. This spatial waveform is converted to an electrical one by a light detector and read out on an oscilloscope. This oscilloscope also displays the torque or force waveform from the capacitor driving the current in the Helmholtz coils. Phase delay is determined by comparing these waveforms.

Resonance is minimized through the use of short specimens—which have higher resonant frequencies—and by reducing the inertia (magnetic and mass moments) of the magnet. Cubic samarium-cobalt magnets are ideal for high frequency studies. Due to the sample geometry being a short rectangular bar or cylinder, the equation governing the resonance of the BVS specimen geometry has an exact analytic solution, which allows the technique to yield results even for high loss materials. This exact solution provides a relationship between dynamic moduli, angular displacement, and geometric parameters. The inherent lack of drift and friction in the apparatus is responsible for its large range of operating frequencies.
