= Viscoelasticity of bone =

Mechanical property of bone

Viscoelasticity of bone can arise from multiple factors related to structures on multiple length scales. Bone is a composite of the bio-polymer collagen and the bio-ceramic hydroxyapatite. Additionally, the collagen is plied in various directions around the bone. Bone has two structural forms; cortical and cancellous. The viscoelasticity of bone can therefore arise from the void collapse and deossification of cancellous bone, and the natural viscoelastic response of collagen as a polymer.

== Viscoelasticity ==
Viscoelasticity is the phenomena of time-dependent strain exhibited by amorphous materials such as polymers or glasses. The viscoelasticity of materials depend on the viscosity and can be mechanically modelled using mechanical elements known as springs and dashpots. In turn, constitutive equations can relate the mechanical interpretation of viscoelasticity to the materials properties and strain rate.
