= Visco-elastic jets =

Projected stream of a viscoelastic fluid

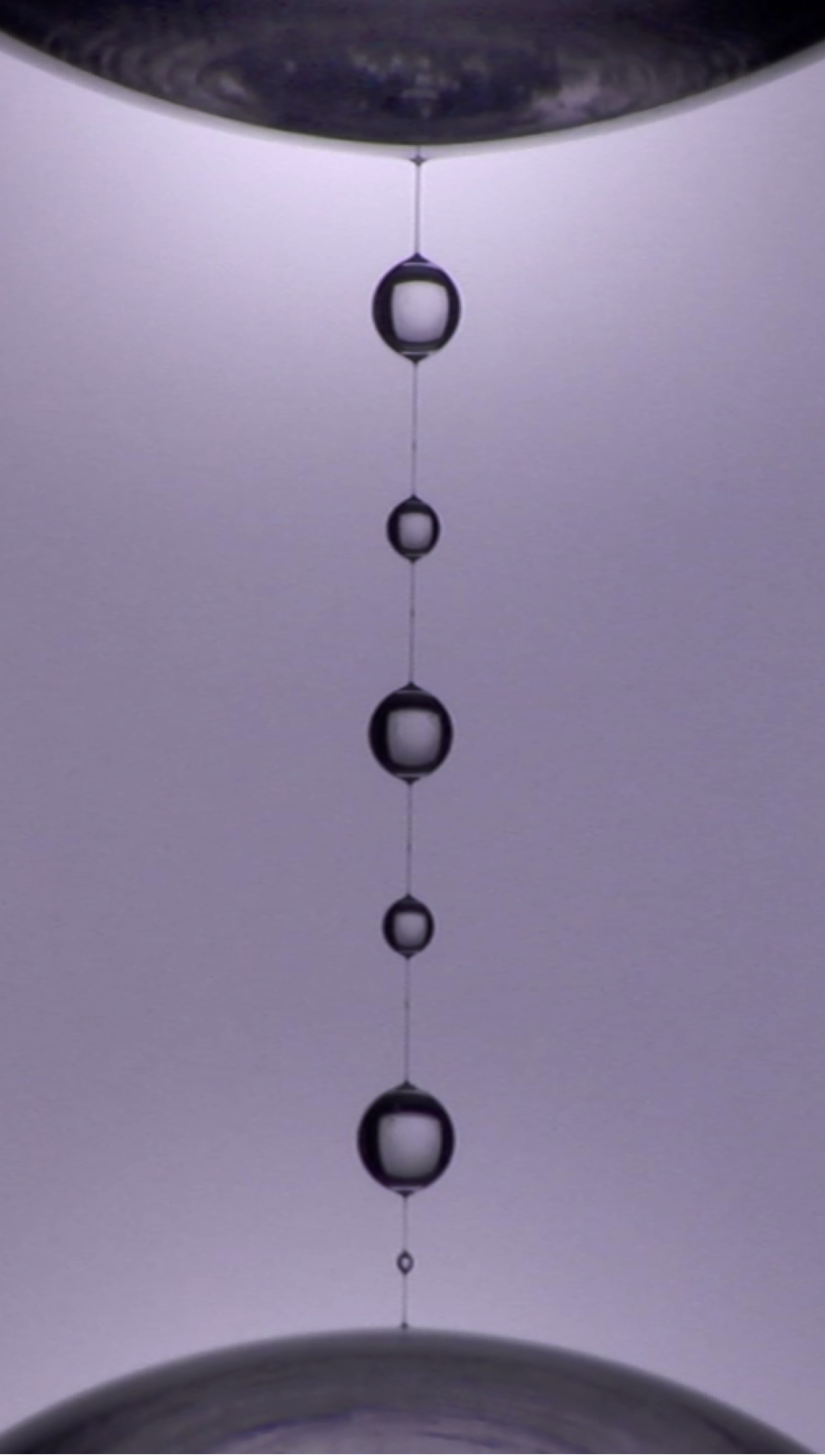
Saliva exhibits viscoelastic "beads-on-a-string" structure.

In fluid mechanics, a viscoelastic jet is a projected stream (jet) of a viscoelastic fluid (a fluid that disobeys Newton's law of viscosity). A viscoelastic fluid returns to its original shape after the applied stress is released.

Free surface continuous jets of viscoelastic fluids are relevant in engineering applications involving blood, paints, adhesives, and foodstuff as well as in industrial processes like fiber spinning, bottle filling, and oil drilling. In process engineering, it is essential to understand the instabilities a jet undergoes due to changes in fluid parameters like the Reynolds number (Re) or Deborah number (De). With the advent of microfluidics, an understanding of the jetting properties of non-Newtonian fluids becomes essential from micro- to macro-length scales, and from low to high Reynolds numbers.

== Description ==
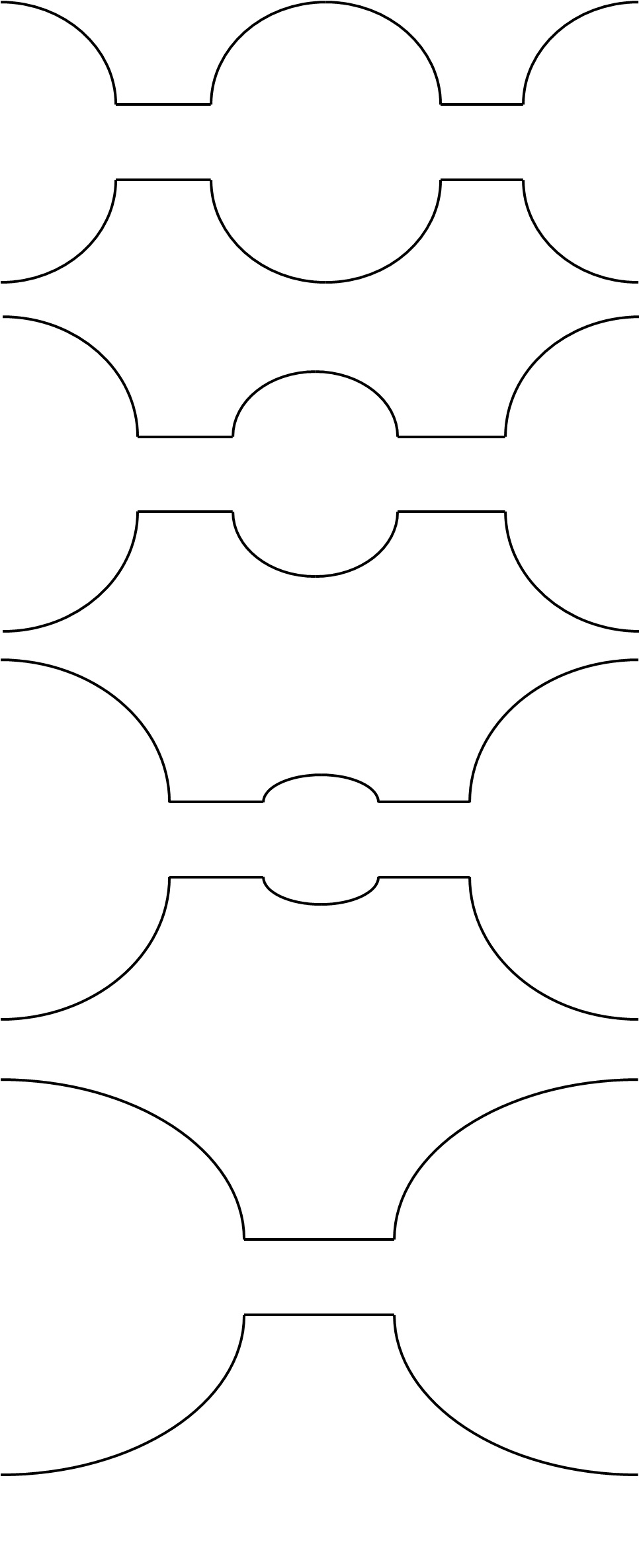
Drop draining

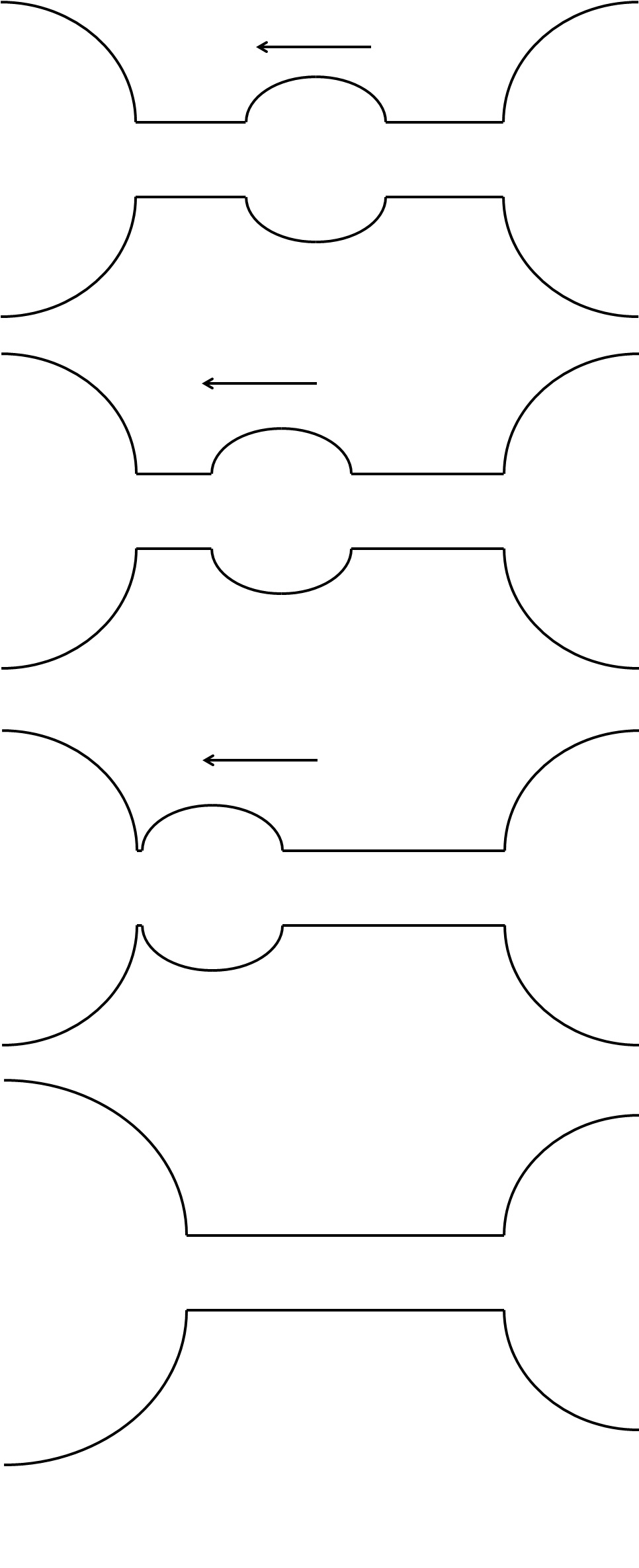
Drop merging

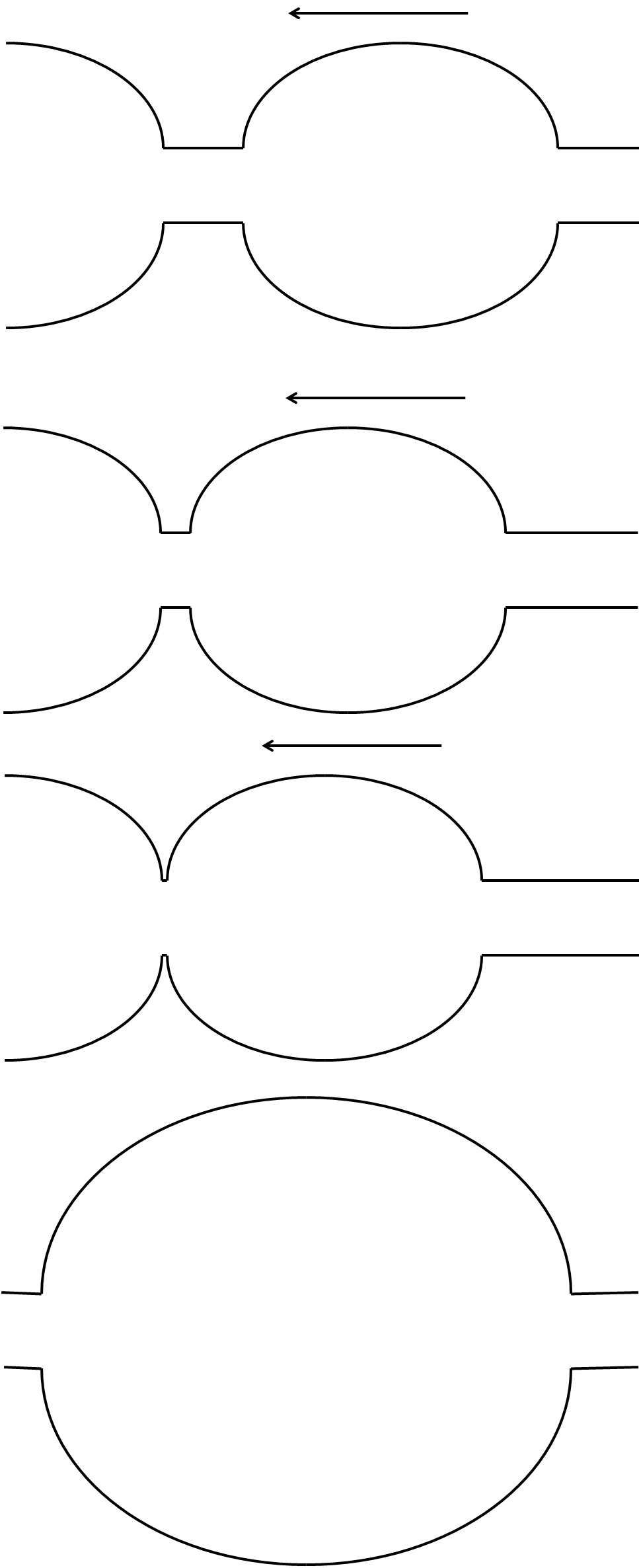
Drop collision

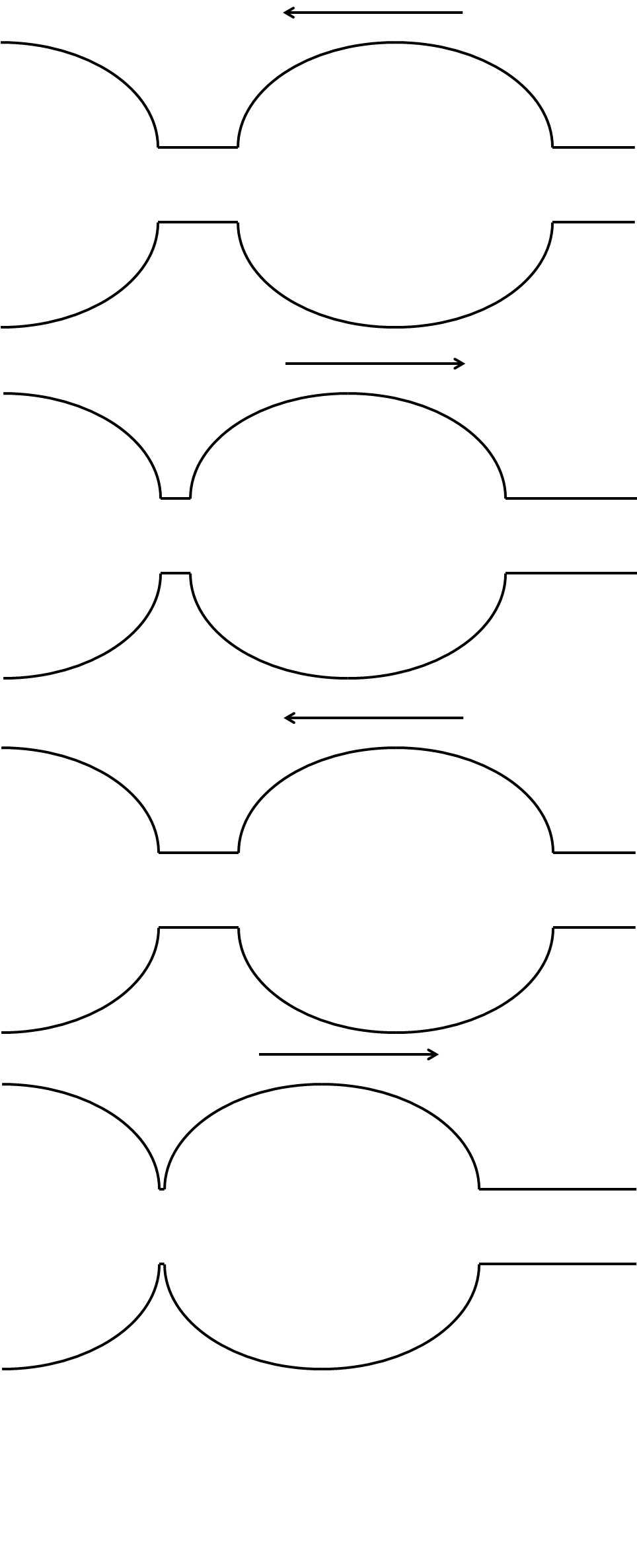
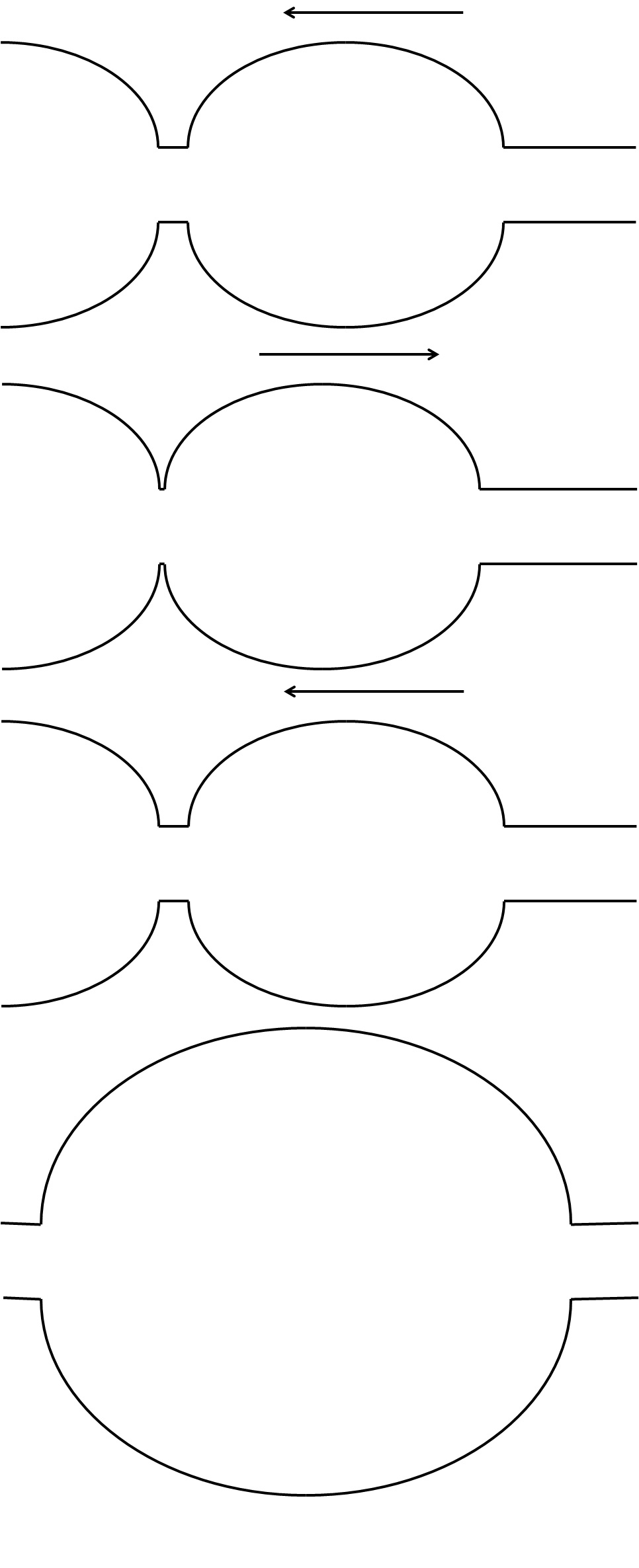
Drop oscillation
(right image is a continuation of left image)

A jet of a Newtonian fluid, such as honey poured from a bottle, thins continuously and coils regularly. In contrast, a viscoelastic jet breaks up much more slowly. Typically, it evolves into a "beads-on-a-string" structure, where large drops are connected by thin threads. The slow breakup process provides the viscoelastic jet sufficient time to exhibit other phenomena, including:

- drop draining – a small bead between two beads shrinks as its fluid particles move towards the adjacent beads ("drains away");
- drop merging – a smaller bead and a larger bead move close to each other and merge to form a single bead;
- drop collision – a moving bead collides and combines with an adjacent bead;
- drop oscillation – two adjacent beads start oscillating, their separation gradually decreases, and they eventually merge to form a single bead.

The behaviors of non-Newtonian fluids result from the interplay of non-Newtonian properties (e.g. viscoelasticity, shear-thinning) with gravitational, viscous, and inertial effects.

The evolution of a viscoelastic fluid thread over time depends on the relative magnitude of the viscous, inertial, and elastic stresses and the capillary pressure. To study the inertio-elasto-capillary balance for a jet, two dimensionless parameters are defined: the Ohnesorge number (Oh)
$$\mathrm{Oh} = \frac{\eta_0}{\sqrt[]{\rho\gamma R_0}}$$
which is the inverse of the Reynolds number based on a characteristic capillary velocity $\tfrac{\gamma}{\eta_0};$ and the intrinsic Deborah number (De), defined as
$$\mathrm{De} = \frac{\lambda}{t_r} = \frac{\lambda}{\sqrt{\rho R_0^3/\gamma}}$$
where

t_{r} is the "Rayleigh time scale" for inertio-capillary breakup of an inviscid jet;
ρ is the fluid density;
η_{0} is the fluid zero shear viscosity;
γ is the surface tension;
R_{0} is the initial radius of the jet;
λ is the relaxation time associated with the polymer solution.

== Equations ==
Like other fluids, when considering viscoelastic flows, the velocity, pressure, and stress must satisfy equations of mass and momentum, supplemented with a constitutive equation involving the velocity and stress.

The behaviors of weakly viscoelastic jets can be described by the following set of mathematical equations, with the first representing mass conservation, and the second representing the momentum equation in one dimension:

$$\begin{align}
& \frac{\partial R}{\partial t} + \frac{\partial vR^2}{\partial z}=0 \\[5pt]
&\rho\left(\frac{\partial v}{\partial t} + \frac{v\partial}{\partial z} \right) = -\gamma\frac{\partial \kappa}{\partial t} + \frac{3\eta_s}{R^2} \frac{\partial\! \left(R^2\frac{\partial v}{\partial z}\right)}{\partial z} + \frac{1}{R^2}\frac{\partial \bigl(R^2(\sigma_{zz}-\sigma_{rr}) \bigr)}{\partial z} \\[5pt]
&\kappa = \frac{1}{R(1+R_z^2)^\frac{1}{2}} - \frac{R_{zz}}{(1+R_{zz}^2)^\frac{3}{2}}
\end{align}$$

where

(z, t) is the axial velocity;
η_{s} and η_{p} are the solvent and polymer contribution to the total viscosity, respectively (total viscosity η_{0} = η_{s} + η_{p});
R_{z} indicates the partial derivative $\tfrac{\partial R}{\partial z}$;
σ_{zz} and σ_{rr} are the diagonal terms of the extra-stress tensor, calculated as follows:
$$\begin{align}
\sigma_{zz} + \lambda\left(\frac{\partial \sigma_{zz}}{\partial t} + v\frac{\partial \sigma_{zz}}{\partial z} - 2\frac{\partial v}{\partial z}\sigma_{zz}\right) + \frac{\alpha \lambda}{\eta_p}\sigma_{zz}^2 &= 2\eta_p\frac{\partial v}{\partial z} \\[5pt]
\sigma_{rr} + \lambda\left(\frac{\partial \sigma_{rr}}{\partial t} + v\frac{\partial \sigma_{rr}}{\partial z} +\phantom{2} \frac{\partial v}{\partial z}\sigma_{rr}\right) + \frac{\alpha \lambda}{\eta_p}\sigma_{rr}^2 &= -\eta_p\frac{\partial v}{\partial z}
\end{align}$$

where λ is the relaxation time of the liquid, and
α is the mobility factor, a positive dimensionless parameter corresponding to the anisotropy of the hydrodynamic drag on the polymer molecules.
