= Lignin characterization =

The term "lignin characterization" (or "lignin analysis") refers to a group of activities within lignin research aiming at describing the characteristics of a lignin by determination of its most important properties. Most often, this term is used to describe the characterization of technical lignins by means of chemical or thermo-chemical analysis. Technical lignins are lignins isolated from various biomasses during various kinds of technical processes such as wood pulping. The most common technical lignins include lignosulphonates (isolated from sulfite pulping), kraft lignins (isolated from kraft pulping black liquor), organosolv lignins (isolated from organosolv pulping), soda lignins (isolated from soda pulping) and lignin residue after enzymatic treatment of biomass.

== Important characteristics ==
Lignins can be characterized by determination of their purity, molecular structure and thermal properties. For certain applications, other properties such as electrical properties or color may be relevant to determine.

=== Purity ===
==== Dry matter content ====
The dry matter content of lignins is the residue after drying at specified conditions. Any matter that is volatile at the drying conditions is not included in the dry matter content. The moisture content can be approximated by 100% minus the dry matter content. To determine the dry matter content, The sample is dried at a temperature of 105±2 °C. The mass before and after the drying is determined gravimetrically. The dry matter content of sample is calculated as the ratio of mass after to the mass before the drying.

==== Lignin content ====
The lignin content can be defined as the sum of the amount of acid-insoluble matter and acid-soluble matter, absorbing at 205 nm, after sulphuric acid hydrolysis during specified conditions, as determined by gravimetry and spectrophotometry, in milligrams per gram. In the determination, the samples are hydrolyzed with sulphuric acid using a two-step technique. The amount of lignin is determined using gravimetry and spectrophotometry.

==== Carbohydrate content ====
The carbohydrate content can be defined as the sum of the amounts of the five principal, neutral wood monosaccharides; arabinose, galactose, glucose, mannose and xylose in anhydrous form, in a sample, in milligrams per gram. In the determination, the samples are hydrolyzed with sulphuric acid using a two-step technique. The amounts of the different monosaccharides are determined using ion chromatography (IC).

==== Ash content ====
The ash content can be defined as the gravimetrically determined residue after ignition at a defined temperature, in a sample, in percent (weight / weight dry matter of sample). In the determination, a sample is weighed in a heat-resistant crucible, dried at 105±2 °C, and ignited in a muffle furnace at 525±25 °C. The ash content is then determined, on a moisture-free basis, from the weight of residue after ignition and the moisture content of the sample.

==== Metal/elements content ====
The metal elements content (including sulphur) may be determined as the sum of the elements Al, Ba, Ca, Cu, Fe, K, Mg, Mn, Na, P, Si, S and Zn after oxidation and acid digestion. The metal elements can be determined by inductively coupled plasma optical emission spectroscopy (ICP-OES) after wet digestion. In such a determination, the samples are oxidized by hydrogen peroxide and subsequently acid digested in a closed vessel using a microwave acid digestion apparatus. After cooling, the samples are diluted and the concentration of each element determined by the ICP-OES.

==== Extractives content ====
The extractives content can be defined as the sum of matter that can be extracted by petroleum ether, and that does not evaporate during drying. This material consists mainly of fatty acids, resin acids, fatty alcohols, sterols, glycerides and steryl esters. In the determination, the samples are extracted with petroleum ether in a for instance a Soxtec apparatus. After extraction, the solvents are evaporated and the residue is dried. Note that petroleum ether extracts may also contain elemental sulphur, S8, if present in the lignin sample. If the dried extracts contain a yellowish precipitate, this indicates that sulphur is present.

=== Molecular structure ===
==== Hydroxyl groups ====
The main hydroxyl groups in lignin are aliphatic (R–OH), phenolic (Ph–OH) and carboxylic acid (R–COOH) hydroxyl groups. Phenolic hydroxyl groups are syringyl (S), guaiacyl (G) and p-hydroxyphenyl (H) structures and C5-substituted (i.e. having β-5, 4-O-5 and 5-5 inter-unit linkages) structures. The hydroxyl groups may be determined by 31P nuclear magnetic resonance spectroscopy. In such a determination, the lignin sample is dissolved using a mixture of DMF and pyridine (in excess for a quantitative reaction), in the presence of an internal standard (IS) and a relaxation reagent (RR), and then phosphitylated using a mixture of a derivatisation regent (DR) and deuterated chloroform. The phosphitylated sample is then scanned using liquide state 31P-NMR spectroscopy and the hydroxyl groups are quantified by integration of the corresponding signals from obtained 31P-NMR spectra.

==== Structural elements ====
Structural elements in lignins are the building blocks in the macromolecule corresponding to the monomers and the intra-molecular bonds. For lignins, the structural elements are often determined by pyrolysis-gas chromatography-mass spectrometry (py-GC-MS) or nuclear magnetic resonance spectroscopy (NMR).

==== Molar mass distribution ====
The molar mass distribution of lignin describe the relationship between the number of moles of each lignin molecule species and the molar mass of that species. Different average values can be defined, depending on the statistical method applied. For lignins, weight-average molar mass (Mw) and number-average molar mass (Mn) are often determined. In addition, the peak molar mass (Mp) is often determined. For kraft lignins, the molar mass distribution can be determined by aqueous phase or organic phase size-exclusion chromatography.

=== Thermal properties ===
==== Glass transition temperature ====
The glass transition temperature (Tg) can be defined by the temperature at which an amorphous polymeric material undergoes a reversible transition from a hard, solid state to a more rubbery state, as determined as inflection point of the heat capacity-temperature curve recorded by differential scanning calorimetry (DSC). In the determination, the samples are often dried at 105 °C and subsequently analyzed by DSC in a hermetic aluminum pan by increasing the temperature above the Tg, and recording the heat capacity-temperature curve.

=== Electric properties ===
Carbonized lignin can be used in electrical applications such as batteries and supercapacitors. The electrical properties of carbonized lignin can be assessed with techniques such as two-and four-point method, impedance spectroscopy, galvanostatic charge-discharge and cyclic voltammetry.
