= Resonant ultrasound spectroscopy =

Resonant ultrasound spectroscopy (RUS) is a laboratory technique used in geology and material science to measure fundamental material properties involving elasticity. This technique relies on the fact that solid objects have natural frequencies at which they vibrate when mechanically excited. The natural frequency depends on the elasticity, size, and shape of the object—RUS exploits this property of solids to determine the elastic tensor of the material. The great advantage of this technique is that the entire elastic tensor is obtained from a single crystal sample in a single rapid measurement. At lower or more general frequencies, this method is known as acoustic resonance spectroscopy.

== History ==
Interest in elastic properties made its entrance with 17th century philosophers, but the real theory of elasticity, indicating that the elastic constants of a material could be obtained by measuring sound velocities in that material, was summarized only two hundred of years later. In 1964, D. B. Frasier and R. C. LeCraw used the solution calculated in 1880 by G. Lamé and H. Lamb to solve the forward problem, and then inverted it graphically, in what may be the first RUS measurement. Nevertheless, we had to wait for the participation of geophysics community, interested in determining the Earth's interior structure, to solve the inverse problem: in 1970 three geophysicists improved the previous method and introduced the term resonant sphere technique (RST). Excited by the encouraging results achieved with lunar samples, one of them gave one of his students the task of extending the method for use with cube shaped samples. This method, now known as the rectangular parallelepiped resonance (RPR) method, was further extended by I. Ohno in 1976. Finally, at the end of the 1980s, A. Migliori and J. Maynard expanded the limits of the technique in terms of loading and low-level electronic measurements, and with W. Visscher brought the computer algorithms to their current state, introducing the final term resonant ultrasound spectroscopy (RUS).

== Theory ==
Firstly, one must solve the problem of calculating the natural frequencies in terms of sample dimensions, mass, and a set of hypothetical elastic constants (the forward problem). Then one must apply a nonlinear inversion algorithm to find the elastic constants from the measured natural frequencies (the inverse problem).

=== Lagrangian minimization ===
All RUS measurements are performed on samples that are free vibrators. Because a complete analytical solution for the free vibrations of solids does not exist, one must rely upon approximations. Finite element methods are based on balancing the forces applied to a differential volume element, then calculating its response. Energy minimization methods on the other hand determine the minimum energy, and thus the equilibrium configuration for the object. Among the energy minimization techniques, the Lagrangian minimization is the most used in the RUS analyses because of its advantage in speed (an order of magnitude smaller than the finite-element methods).

The procedure begins with an object of volume V, bounded by its free surface S. The Lagrangian is given by

$L =\int_V ( KE - PE ) dV (1)$

where KE is the kinetic energy density

$KE =\frac{1}{2} \sum_{i} \rho \omega^2 u_i^2 (2)$

and PE is the potential energy density

$PE =\frac{1}{2} \sum_{i,j,k,l} c_{i,j,k,l} \frac{du_i}{dx_j} \frac{du_k}{dx_l} (3)$

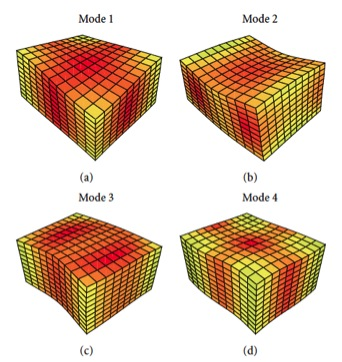
Fig. 1: Computer-generated illustrations of some normal modes of vibrations for a rectangular parallelepiped sample.

Here, $u_i$ is the ith component of the displacement vector, ω is the angular frequency from harmonic time dependence, $c_{i,j,k,l}$ is a component of the elastic stiffness tensor, and ρ is the density. Subscripts i, j, etc., refer to Cartesian coordinate directions.

To find the minimum of the Lagrangian, calculate the differential of L as a function of u, the arbitrary variation of u in V and on S. This gives:

$\delta L =\int_V \Bigl\{ \sum_i \Bigl[ \rho \omega^2 u_i - \sum_{j,k,l} c_{i,j,k,l} \frac{\delta^2 u_k}{\delta x_j \delta x_l} \Bigr] \delta u_i \Bigr\} dV - \int_S \Bigl\{ \sum_i \Bigl[ \sum_{j,k,l} \vec n c_{i,j,k,l} \frac{\delta u_k}{\delta x_l} \Bigr] du_i \Bigr\} dS (4)$

Because $u_i$ is arbitrary in V and on S, both terms in square brackets must be zero. Setting the first term equal to zero yields the elastic wave equation. The second square bracketed term is an expression of free surface boundary conditions; $\vec n$ is the unit vector normal to S. For a free body (as we assume it), the latter term sums to zero and can be ignored.

Thus the set of $u_i$ that satisfies the previously mentioned conditions are those displacements that correspond to ω being a normal mode frequency of the system. This suggests that the normal vibrations of an object (Fig. 1) may be calculated by applying a variational method (in our case the Rayleigh-Ritz variational method, explained in the next paragraph) to determine both the normal mode frequencies and the description of the physical oscillations. To quote Visscher, getting both equations from the basic Lagrangian is "a mathematical fortuity that may have occurred during a lapse in Murphy's vigilance".

=== Rayleigh-Ritz variational method ===
The actuation of this approach requires the expansion of the $u_i$ in a set of basis functions appropriate to the geometry of the body, substituting that expression into Eq. (1) and reducing the problem to that of diagonalizing a N×N matrix (eigenvalue problem). The stationary points of the Lagrangian are found by solving the eigenvalue problem resulting from Eq. (4), that is,

$\omega^2 E a = \Gamma a (5)$

where an are the approximations to the motion expanded in a complete basis set, E comes from the kinetic energy term, and Γ comes from the elastic energy term. The order of the matrices is ~10^3 for good approximations.

Equation (5) determines the resonance frequencies from the elastic moduli.

=== The inverse problem ===
The inverse problem of deducing the elastic constants from a measured spectrum of mechanical resonances has no analytical solution, so it needs to be solved by computational methods. For the indirect method, a starting resonant frequency spectrum, $f_n^{cal}$ (n=1,2,...) is calculated using estimated values for the elastic constants and the known sample dimensions and density. The difference between the calculated and measured resonance frequency spectrum, $f_n^{mea}$ (n=1,2,...) is quantified by a figure of merit function,

$F =\sum_n w_n (f_n^{cal} - f_n^{mea})^2 (6)$

where $w_n$ (n=1,2,...) are weight coefficients reflecting the confidence on individual resonance measurements. Then, a minimization of the function F is sought by regressing the values of all the elastic constants using computer software developed for this process.

== Measurements ==
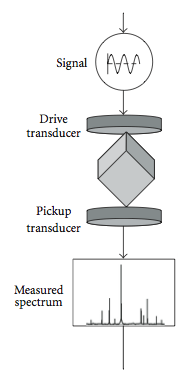
Fig. 2: Schematic of the two transducer resonant ultrasound spectroscopy set up.

The most common method for detecting the mechanical resonant spectrum is illustrated in Fig. 2, where a small parallelepiped-shaped sample is lightly held between two piezoelectric transducers. One transducer is used to generate an elastic wave of constant amplitude and varying frequency, whereas the other is used to detect the sample's resonance. As a frequency range is swept, a sequence of resonance peaks is recorded. The position of these peaks occurs at the natural frequencies $f_n$ (from which the elastic constants are determined) and the quality factor Q (a measure of how narrow the resonance is) provides information about the dissipation of elastic energy.

Unlike in a conventional ultrasonic measure, in a method that resonates the sample a strong coupling between the transducer and the sample is not required, because the sample behaves as a natural amplifier. Rather, keeping at minimum the couple between them, you get a good approximation to free surface boundary conditions and tend to preserve the Q, too. For variable-temperature measurements the sample is held between the ends of two buffer rods that link the sample to the transducers (Fig. 3) because the transducers must be kept at room temperature. In terms of pressure, on the contrary, there is a limit of only a few bars, because the application of higher pressures leads to dampening of the resonances of the sample.

=== Samples ===
RUS can be applied to a great range of samples sizes, with a minimum in the order or a few hundred micrometers, but for the measurement of mineral elasticity it is used on samples typically between 1 mm and 1 cm in size.

The sample, either a fully dense polycrystalline aggregate or a single crystal, is machined in to a regular shape. Theoretically any sample shape can be used, but you obtain a substantial saving in computational time using rectangular parallelepiped resonators (RPR), spherical or cylindrical ones (less time savings with cylinders).

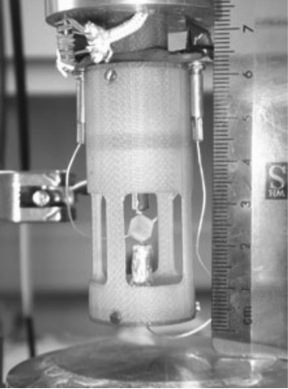
Fig. 3: The sample assembly for a RUS variable-temperature measurement.

Since the accuracy of the measure depends strictly on the accuracy in the sample preparation, several precautions are taken: RPRs are prepared with the edges parallel to crystallographic directions; for cylinders only the axis can be matched to sample symmetry. RUS is rarely used for samples of lower symmetry, and for isotropic samples, alignment is irrelevant. For the higher symmetries, it is convenient to have different lengths edges to prevent a redundant resonance.

Measurements on single crystals require orientation of the sample crystallographic axes with the edges of the RPR, to neglect the orientation computation and deal only with elastic moduli.

Polycrystalline samples should ideally be fully dense, free of cracks and without preferential orientation of the grains. Single crystal samples must be free of internal defects such as twin walls. The surfaces of all samples must be polished flat and opposite faces should be parallel. Once prepared, the density must be measured accurately as it scales the entire set of elastic moduli.

=== Transducers ===
RUS ultrasonic transducers are designed to make dry point contact with the sample. This is due to the requirement for free surface boundary conditions for the computation of elastic moduli from frequencies. For RPRs this requires a very light touch between the sample's corners and the transducers. Corners are used because they provide elastically weak coupling, reducing loading, and because they are never vibrational node points. Sufficiently weak contact ensures no transduced correction is required.

== Applications ==
As a versatile tool for characterizing elastic properties of solid materials, RUS has found applications in a variety of fields. In geosciences one of the most important applications is related to the determination of seismic velocities in the Earth's interior. In a recent work, for example, the elastic constants of hydrous forsterite were measured up to 14.1 GPa at ambient temperature. This study showed that aggregate bulk and shear moduli of hydrous forsterite increase with pressure at a greater rate than those of the corresponding anhydrous phase. This implies that at ambient conditions VP and VS of hydrous forsterite are slower than those of anhydrous one; conversely, with increasing pressure, and consequently depth, V_{P} and V_{S} of hydrous forsterite exceed those of anhydrous one. In addition hydration decreases the V_{P}/V_{S} ratio of forsterite, the maximum compressional wave azimuthal anisotropy and the maximum shear wave splitting. These data help us to constrain Earth's mantle composition and distinguish regions of hydrogen enrichment from regions of high temperature or partial melt.
