= Menter's Shear Stress Transport =

Turbulence model

Menter's Shear Stress Transport turbulence model, or SST, is a widely used and robust 2-equation eddy-viscosity turbulence model used in Computational Fluid Dynamics. The model combines the k-omega turbulence model and K-epsilon turbulence model such that the k-omega is used in the inner region of the boundary layer and switches to the k-epsilon in the free shear flow.

== History ==
The SST two equation turbulence model was introduced in 1994 by F.R. Menter to deal with the strong freestream sensitivity of the k-omega turbulence model and improve the predictions of adverse pressure gradients. The formulation of the SST model is based on physical experiments and attempts to predict solutions to typical engineering problems. Over the last two decades the model has been altered to more accurately reflect certain flow conditions. The Reynold's Averaged Eddy-viscosity is a pseudo-force and not physically present in the system. The two variables calculated are usually interpreted so k is the turbulence kinetic energy and omega is the rate of dissipation of the eddies.

== SST (Menter’s Shear Stress Transport) turbulence model ==
$\frac{\partial (\rho k)}{\partial t} + \frac{\partial (\rho u_j k)}{\partial x_j} = P - \beta^* \rho \omega k + \frac{\partial}{\partial x_j} \left[\left(\mu + \sigma_k \mu_t \right)\frac{\partial k}{\partial x_j}\right]$

$\frac{\partial (\rho \omega)}{\partial t} + \frac{\partial (\rho u_j \omega)}{\partial x_j} = \frac{\gamma}{\nu_t} P - \beta \rho \omega^2 + \frac{\partial}{\partial x_j} \left[ \left( \mu + \sigma_{\omega} \mu_t \right) \frac{\partial \omega}{\partial x_j} \right] + 2(1-F_1) \frac{\rho \sigma_{\omega 2}}{\omega} \frac{\partial k}{\partial x_j} \frac{\partial \omega}{\partial x_j}$

== Variable Definition ==
$P = \tau_{ij} \frac{\partial u_i}{\partial x_j}$

$\tau_{ij} = \mu_t \left(2S_{ij} - \frac{2}{3} \frac{\partial u_k}{\partial x_k} \delta_{ij} \right) - \frac{2}{3} \rho k \delta_{ij}$

$S_{ij} = \frac{1}{2} \left( \frac{\partial u_i}{\partial x_j} + \frac{\partial u_j}{\partial x_i} \right)$

$\mu_t = \frac{\rho a_1 k}{{\rm max} (a_1 \omega, \Omega F_2)}$

$F_1 = {\rm tanh} \left({\rm arg}_1^4 \right)$

${\rm arg}_1 = {\rm min} \left[ {\rm max} \left( \frac{\sqrt{k}}{\beta^*\omega d}, \frac{500 \nu}{d^2 \omega} \right) , \frac{4 \rho \sigma_{\omega 2} k}{{\rm CD}_{k \omega} d^2} \right]$

${\rm CD}_{k \omega} = {\rm max} \left(2 \rho \sigma_{\omega 2} \frac{1}{\omega} \frac{\partial k}{\partial x_j} \frac{\partial \omega}{\partial x_j}, 10^{-20} \right)$

$F_2 = {\rm tanh} \left({\rm arg}_2^2 \right)$

${\rm arg}_2 = {\rm max} \left( 2 \frac{\sqrt{k}}{\beta^* \omega d}, \frac{500 \nu}{d^2 \omega} \right)$

The constants β, σ_{k}, σ_{ω} are computed by a blend from the corresponding constants via the following formula

$\phi = F_1 \phi_1 + (1-F_1) \phi_2$

== Constants ==
=== K-W Closure ===
$\sigma_{k1} = 0.85$ , $\sigma_{w1} = 0.65$ , $\beta_{1} = 0.075$

=== K-e Closure ===
$\sigma_{k2} = 1.00$ , $\sigma_{w2} = 0.856$ , $\beta_{2} = 0.0828$

=== SST Closure Constants ===
$\beta^* = 0.09$ , $a_1 = 0.31$

== Boundary and Far Field Conditions ==
=== Far Field ===
$\frac{U_{\infty}}{L} < \omega_{\rm farfield} < 10 \frac{U_{\infty}}{L}$

$\frac{10^{-5} U_{\infty}^2}{Re_L} < k_{\rm farfield} < \frac{0.1 U_{\infty}^2}{Re_L}$

=== Boundary/Wall Conditions ===
$\omega_{wall} = 10 \frac{6 \nu}{\beta_1 (\Delta d_1)^2}$

$k_{wall} = 0$

Most software implementations like OpenFOAM and ANSYS Fluent do not include the factor of 10 for omega at the wall, following a Wilcox formulation. However, in F.R. Menter states: "present author found it much easier and as accurate to implement the following boundary condition"

== Validation with experimental results ==
A good agreement between mass-transfer simulations with experimental data were attained for turbulent flow using the SST two equation turbulence model developed by F.R. Menter for rectangular and tubular shapes, a modified hydrocyclone and for curved rotating systems taking into account a curvature correction term.

== Notes ==
- 'CFD Online Wilcox k-omega turbulence model description'. Accessed May 12, 2014. http://www.cfd-online.com/Wiki/Wilcox%27s_k-omega_model
- 'An Introduction to Computational Fluid Dynamics: The Finite Volume Method (2nd Edition)', H. Versteeg, W. Malalasekera; Pearson Education Limited; 2007; ISBN 0131274988
- 'Turbulence Modeling for CFD' 2nd Ed., Wilcox C. D.; DCW Industries; 1998; ISBN 0963605100
- 'An introduction to turbulence and its measurement', Bradshaw, P.; Pergamon Press; 1971; ISBN 0080166210
