= Moog =

Moog may refer to:

== Companies ==
- Moog Inc., an aerospace and defense company with a focus on control-systems
- Moog Music, a synthesizer manufacturer founded by Robert Moog

== Electronics and computing ==
- Moog synthesizer, a synthesizer invented by Robert Moog
- Moog (code), astronomical software

== People ==
- Moog (surname)
- Robert Moog, synthesizer designer
- Moog 4, defendants in a case involving protest against Moog Inc's alleged military exports to Israel
- Blair Joscelyne (alias Moog), composer and filmmaker
- Andy Moog, ice hockey goaltender

== Albums ==
- The Happy Moog, a 1969 album by Jean-Jacques Perrey and Harry Breuer.
- Music to Moog By, a 1969 album by Gershon Kingsley.
- The Moog Strikes Bach, a 1969 album by Hans Wurman.
- Moog Indigo, a 1970 album by Jean-Jacques Perrey.
- Moog Sensations, a 1971 album by Jean-Jacques Perrey.
- Moog Expressions, a 1972 album by Jean-Jacques Perrey and Pat Prilly.
- First Moog Quartet, a 1972 album by Kingsley's homonymous group
- Moog Mig Mag Moog, a 1974 album by Jean-Jacques Perrey.
- The Moog Cookbook, a 1996 album of The Moog Cookbook.

== Music ==
- :"Moog City", a song by C418 from the album Minecraft – Volume Alpha, 2011
  - "Moog City 2", a reworked version of "Moog City" by C418 from the album Minecraft – Volume Beta, 2013
- "Moog Island" a song by Morcheeba from album Who Can You Trust, 1996

== Other ==
- Moog (film), a 2004 biographical film about Robert Moog
- Moog Center for Deaf Education
- The Moog, a dog-like character in the British children's TV cartoon Willo the Wisp
- The Moog, a Hungarian band
- MOOG, a brand of mid- and high-end auto parts owned by DRiV Incorporated, a subsidiary of Tenneco
