= Boussinesq approximation =

Boussinesq approximation may refer to several modelling concepts – as introduced by Joseph Valentin Boussinesq (1842–1929), a French mathematician and physicist known for advances in fluid dynamics:

- Boussinesq approximation (buoyancy) for buoyancy-driven flows for small density differences in the fluid
- Boussinesq approximation (water waves) for long waves propagating on the surface of a fluid layer under the action of gravity
- Turbulence modeling and eddy viscosity: in modelling the turbulence Reynolds stresses, the Boussinesq approximation results in the use of an eddy viscosity concept
