= Reynolds stress equation model =

Mathematical model of turbulence

Reynolds stress equation model (RSM), also referred to as second moment closures are the most complete classical turbulence model. In these models, the eddy-viscosity hypothesis is avoided and the individual components of the Reynolds stress tensor are directly computed. These models use the exact Reynolds stress transport equation for their formulation. They account for the directional effects of the Reynolds stresses and the complex interactions in turbulent flows. Reynolds stress models offer significantly better accuracy than eddy-viscosity based turbulence models, while being computationally cheaper than Direct Numerical Simulations (DNS) and Large Eddy Simulations.

== Shortcomings of Eddy-viscosity based models ==
Eddy-viscosity based models like the $k-\epsilon$ and the $k-\omega$ models have significant shortcomings in complex, real-life turbulent flows. For instance, in flows with streamline curvature, flow separation, flows with zones of re-circulating flow or flows influenced by mean rotational effects, the performance of these models is unsatisfactory.

Such one- and two-equation based closures cannot account for the return to isotropy of turbulence, observed in decaying turbulent flows. Eddy-viscosity based models cannot replicate the behaviour of turbulent flows in the Rapid Distortion limit, where the turbulent flow essentially behaves as an elastic medium (instead of viscous).

== Reynolds Stress Transport Equation ==
Reynolds Stress equation models rely on the Reynolds Stress Transport equation. The equation for the transport of kinematic Reynolds stress $R_{ij}=\langle u_{i}^\prime u_{j}^\prime\rangle=-\tau _{ij}/\rho$ is

$$\frac{DR_{ij}}{Dt} = D_{ij}+ P_{ij}+ \Pi_{ij}+ \Omega_{ij}- \varepsilon_{ij}$$

Rate of change of $R_{ij}$ + Transport of $R_{ij}$ by convection = Transport of $R_{ij}$ by diffusion + Rate of production of $R_{ij}$ + Transport of $R_{ij}$ due to turbulent pressure-strain interactions + Transport of $R_{ij}$ due to rotation + Rate of dissipation of $R_{ij}$.

The six partial differential equations above represent six independent Reynolds stresses. While the Production term ($P_{ij}$) is closed and does not require modelling, the other terms, like pressure strain correlation ($\Pi_{ij}$) and dissipation ($\varepsilon_{ij}$), are unclosed and require closure models.

== Production term ==
The Production term that is used in CFD computations with Reynolds stress transport equations is

$$P_{ij} = -\left (R_{im}\frac{\partial U_{j}}{\partial x_{m}}+R_{jm}\frac{\partial U_{i}}{\partial x_{m}}\right )$$

Physically, the Production term represents the action of the mean velocity gradients working against the Reynolds stresses. This accounts for the transfer of kinetic energy from the mean flow to the fluctuating velocity field. It is responsible for sustaining the turbulence in the flow through this transfer of energy from the large scale mean motions to the small scale fluctuating motions.

This is the only term that is closed in the Reynolds Stress Transport Equations. It requires no models for its direct evaluation. All other terms in the Reynolds Stress Transport Equations are unclosed and require closure models for their evaluation.

== Rapid Pressure-Strain Correlation term ==
The rapid pressure-strain correlation term redistributes energy among the Reynolds stresses components. This is dependent on the mean velocity gradient and rotation of the co-ordinate axes. Physically, this arises due to the interaction among the fluctuating velocity field and the mean velocity gradient field. The simplest linear form of the model expression is

$$\frac{\Pi^{R}_{ij}}{k}=C_2 S_{ij} +C_3 \left(b_{ik}S_{jk}+b_{jk}S_{ik}-\frac{2}{3}b_{mn}S_{mn}\delta_{ij}\right)+ C_4 \left(b_{ik}W_{jk} + b_{jk}W_{ik}\right)$$

Here $b_{ij}=\frac{\overline{u_iu_j}}{2k}-\frac{\delta_{ij}}{3}$ is the Reynolds stress anisotropy tensor, $S_{ij}$ is the rate of strain term for the mean velocity field and $W_{ij}$ is the rate of rotation term for the mean velocity field. By convention, $C_2, C_3, C_4$ are the coefficients of the rapid pressure strain correlation model. There are many different models for the rapid pressure strain correlation term that are used in simulations. These include the Launder-Reece-Rodi model, the Speziale-Sarkar-Gatski model, the Hallback-Johanssen model, the Mishra-Girimaji model, the nonlocal model, and others.

== Slow Pressure-Strain Correlation term ==
The slow pressure-strain correlation term redistributes energy among the Reynolds stresses. This is responsible for the return to isotropy of decaying turbulence where it redistributes energy to reduce the anisotropy in the Reynolds stresses. Physically, this term is due to the self-interactions amongst the fluctuating field. The model expression for this term is given as

$$\Pi_{ij}^{S}=-C_{1}\frac{\varepsilon}{k}\left(R_{ij}-\frac{2}{3}k\delta_{ij}\right)-C_{2}\left(P_{ij}-\frac{2}{3}P\delta_{ij}\right)$$

There are many different models for the slow pressure strain correlation term that are used in simulations. These include the Rotta model , the Speziale-Sarkar model , besides others.

== Dissipation term ==
The traditional modelling of the dissipation rate tensor $\varepsilon_{\rm ij}$ assumes that the small dissipative eddies are isotropic. In this model the dissipation only affects the normal Reynolds stresses.

$\varepsilon_{\rm ij} = \frac{2}{3}\varepsilon\delta_{ij}$ or $e_{\rm ij} = 0$

where $\varepsilon$ is dissipation rate of turbulent kinetic energy, $\delta_{ij}= 1$ when i = j and 0 when i ≠ j and $e_{\rm ij}$ is the dissipation rate anisostropy defined as $e_{ij} = \frac{\varepsilon_{ij}}{\varepsilon}-\frac{2\delta_{ij}}{3}$.

However, as has been shown by e.g. Rogallo, Schumann & Patterson, Uberoi, Lee & Reynolds and Groth, Hallbäck & Johansson there exist many situations where this simple model of the dissipation rate tensor is insufficient due to the fact that even the small dissipative eddies are anisotropic. To account for this anisotropy in the dissipation rate tensor Rotta proposed a linear model relating the anisotropy of the dissipation rate stress tensor to the anisotropy of the stress tensor.

$\varepsilon_{\rm ij} = \frac{2}{3}\varepsilon\delta_{ij}$ or $e_{\rm ij} = \sigma a_{ij}$

where $a_{ij} = \frac{\overline{u_iu_j}}{k}-\frac{2\delta_{ij}}{3} = 2 b_{ij}$.

The parameter $\sigma$ is assumed to be a function the turbulent Reynolds number, the mean strain rate etc. Physical considerations imply that $\sigma$ should tend to zero when the turbulent Reynolds number tends to infinity and to unity when the turbulent Reynolds number tends to zero. However, the strong realizability condition implies that $\sigma$ should be identically equal to 1.

Based on extensive physical and numerical (DNS and EDQNM) experiments in combination with a strong adherence to fundamental physical and mathematical limitations and boundary conditions Groth, Hallbäck and Johansson proposed an improved model for the dissipation rate tensor.

$$e_{\rm ij} = \left[1+ \alpha \left( \frac{II_{a}}{2} - \frac{2}{3}\right)\right] a_{ij} - \alpha \left(a_{\rm ik}a_{\rm kj}-\frac{1}{3}II_{a}\delta_{\rm ij}\right)$$

where $II_{a} = a_{\rm ij}a_{\rm ji}$ is the second invariant of the tensor $a_{\rm ij}$ and $\alpha$ is a parameter that, in principle, could depend on the turbulent Reynolds number, the mean strain rate parameter etc.

However, Groth, Hallbäck and Johansson used rapid distortion theory to evaluate the limiting value of $\alpha$ which turns out to be 3/4. Using this value the model was tested in DNS-simulations of four different homogeneous turbulent flows. Even though the parameters in the cubic dissipation rate model were fixed through the use of realizability and RDT prior to the comparisons with the DNS data the agreement between model and data was very good in all four cases.

The main difference between this model and the linear one is that each component of $e_{\rm ij}$ is influenced by the complete anisotropic state. The benefit of this cubic model is apparent from the case of an irrotational plane strain in which the streamwise component of $a_{\rm ij}$ is close to zero for moderate strain rates whereas the corresponding component of $e_{\rm ij}$ is not. Such a behaviour cannot be described by a linear model.

== Diffusion term ==
The modelling of diffusion term $D_{ij}$ is based on the assumption that the rate of transport of Reynolds stresses by diffusion is proportional to the gradients of Reynolds stresses. This is an application of the concept of the gradient diffusion hypothesis to modeling the effect of spatial redistribution of the Reynolds stresses due to the fluctuating velocity field. The simplest form of $D_{ij}$ that is followed by commercial CFD codes is

$$D_{ij} = \frac{\partial}{\partial x_{m}}\left(\frac{v_{t}}{\sigma_{k}}\frac{\partial R_{ij}}{\partial x_{m}}\right) = \operatorname{div} \left(\frac{v_{t}}{\sigma_{k}}\nabla(R_{ij})\right)$$

where $\upsilon_{t} = C_{\mu} \frac{k^2}{\varepsilon}$, $\sigma_{k} = 1.0$ and $C_{\mu} = 0.09$.

== Rotational term ==
The rotational term is given as

$$\Omega_{ij}=-2\omega_{k}\left (R_{jm}e_{ikm}+R_{im}e_{jkm}\right )$$

here $\omega_{k}$ is the rotation vector, $e_{ijk}$=1 if i,j,k are in cyclic order and are different,$e_{ijk}$=-1 if i,j,k are in anti-cyclic order and are different and $e_{ijk}$=0 in case any two indices are same.

== Advantages of RSM ==
1) Unlike the k-ε model which uses an isotropic eddy viscosity, RSM solves all components of the turbulent transport.
2) It is the most general of all turbulence models and works reasonably well for a large number of engineering flows.
3) It requires only the initial and/or boundary conditions to be supplied.
4) Since the production terms need not be modeled, it can selectively damp the stresses due to buoyancy, curvature effects etc.

== See also ==
- Reynolds Stress
- Isotropy
- Turbulence Modeling
- Eddy
- k-epsilon turbulence model

== See also ==
- k-epsilon turbulence model
- Mixing length model

== Bibliography ==
- "Turbulent Flows", S. B. Pope, Cambridge University Press (2000).
- "Modelling Turbulence in Engineering and the Environment: Second-Moment Routes to Closure", Kemal Hanjalić and Brian Launder, Cambridge University Press (2011).
