= Moog (code) =

MOOG is an astronomical software package. It is an example of Fortran code that performs a variety of spectral line analysis and spectrum synthesis tasks under the assumption of local thermodynamic equilibrium. Moog uses a model photosphere together with a list of atomic or molecular transitions to generate an emergent spectrum by solving the equation of radiative transfer.

The typical use of MOOG is to assist in the determination of the chemical composition of a star, e.g. Sneden (1973). This paper contains also the description of the first version of the code and has been cited about 240 times as of 2008-04-24 by publications in international journals studying the abundances of chemical elements in stars.

The software package has been developed and is maintained by Christopher Sneden, University of Texas at Austin. The current supported version of the code was released in August 2010 and is described in the MOOG User's Guide (see references below). Moog is written in FORTRAN 77.

== Coding ==
The coding is in various subroutines that are called from a few driver routines; these routines are written in standard FORTRAN. The standard MOOG version has been developed on unix, linux and macintosh computers.
