= Moog (surname) =

Moog is a surname. People bearing the name include:

- Andy Moog (born 1960), former NHL goaltender and current assistant coach of the Dallas Stars
- Peter Moog (1871–1930), schizophrenic outsider artist
- Philipp Moog (born 1961), German television actor
- Michael Moog (fl. 1990s), a moniker of music producer Peter Damien
- Robert Moog (1934–2005), an American pioneer of electronic music and inventor of the Moog synthesizer
- William “Bill” C. Moog (1915–1997), American founder of Moog Inc., cousin of Robert Moog
- Willy Moog (1888–1935), philosopher
