= Spalart–Allmaras turbulence model =

One-equation turbulence model for computational fluid dynamics

In physics and fluid dynamics, the Spalart–Allmaras model is a popular mathematical model used in computational fluid dynamics (CFD) to simulate the effects of turbulence. It is a one-equation model, meaning it solves a single transport equation to calculate a variable $\tilde{\nu}$ which is related to the turbulent viscosity. Its main advantages are its relative simplicity and low computational cost, making it widely used for practical engineering problems.

The Spalart–Allmaras model was designed specifically for aerospace applications involving airflow over surfaces (known as wall-bounded flows), and it gives good results for flows subject to slowing pressure, known as adverse pressure gradients. Because of its robustness, it is also gaining popularity in turbomachinery applications. However, it is less accurate for simulations of free-flowing turbulence, such as jets, and cannot predict the natural decay of turbulence in the absence of a surface.

== Original model ==
The turbulent eddy viscosity is given by

$$\nu_t = \tilde{\nu} f_{v1}, \quad f_{v1} = \frac{\chi^3}{\chi^3 + C^3_{v1}}, \quad \chi := \frac{\tilde{\nu}}{\nu}$$

$$\frac{\partial \tilde{\nu}}{\partial t} + u_j \frac{\partial \tilde{\nu}}{\partial x_j} = C_{b1} [1 - f_{t2}] \tilde{S} \tilde{\nu} + \frac{1}{\sigma} \{ \nabla \cdot [(\nu + \tilde{\nu}) \nabla \tilde{\nu}] + C_{b2} | \nabla \tilde{\nu} |^2 \} - \left[C_{w1} f_w - \frac{C_{b1}}{\kappa^2} f_{t2}\right] \left( \frac{\tilde{\nu}}{d} \right)^2 + f_{t1} \Delta U^2$$

$$\tilde{S} \equiv S + \frac{ \tilde{\nu} }{ \kappa^2 d^2 } f_{v2}, \quad f_{v2} = 1 - \frac{\chi}{1 + \chi f_{v1}}$$

$$f_w = g \left[ \frac{ 1 + C_{w3}^6 }{ g^6 + C_{w3}^6 } \right]^{1/6}, \quad g = r + C_{w2}(r^6 - r), \quad r \equiv \frac{\tilde{\nu} }{ \tilde{S} \kappa^2 d^2 }$$

$$f_{t1} = C_{t1} g_t \exp\left( -C_{t2} \frac{\omega_t^2}{\Delta U^2} [ d^2 + g^2_t d^2_t] \right)$$

$$f_{t2} = C_{t3} \exp\left(-C_{t4} \chi^2 \right)$$

$$S = \sqrt{2 \Omega_{ij} \Omega_{ij}}$$

The rotation tensor is given by

$$\Omega_{ij} = \frac{1}{2} ( \partial u_i / \partial x_j - \partial u_j / \partial x_i )$$

where d is the distance from the closest surface and $\Delta U^2$ is the norm of the difference between the velocity at the trip (usually zero) and that at the field point we are considering.

The constants are

$$\begin{matrix}
\sigma &=& 2/3\\
C_{b1} &=& 0.1355\\
C_{b2} &=& 0.622\\
\kappa &=& 0.41\\
C_{w1} &=& C_{b1}/\kappa^2 + (1 + C_{b2})/\sigma \\
C_{w2} &=& 0.3 \\
C_{w3} &=& 2 \\
C_{v1} &=& 7.1 \\
C_{t1} &=& 1 \\
C_{t2} &=& 2 \\
C_{t3} &=& 1.1 \\
C_{t4} &=& 2
\end{matrix}$$

== Modifications to original model ==
According to Spalart it is safer to use the following values for the last two constants:

$$\begin{matrix}
C_{t3} &=& 1.2 \\
C_{t4} &=& 0.5
\end{matrix}$$

Other models related to the S-A model:

DES (1999)

DDES (2006)

== Model for compressible flows ==
There are several approaches to adapting the model for compressible flows.

In all cases, the turbulent dynamic viscosity is computed from

$$\mu_t = \rho \tilde{\nu} f_{v1}$$

where $\rho$ is the local density.

The first approach applies the original equation for $\tilde{\nu}$.

In the second approach, the convective terms in the equation for $\tilde{\nu}$ are modified to

$$\frac{\partial \tilde{\nu}}{\partial t} + \frac{\partial}{\partial x_j} (\tilde{\nu} u_j)= \mbox{RHS}$$

where the right hand side (RHS) is the same as in the original model.

The third approach involves inserting the density inside some of the derivatives on the LHS and RHS.

The second and third approaches are not recommended by the original authors, but they are found in several solvers.

== Boundary conditions ==
Walls: $\tilde{\nu}=0$

Freestream:

Ideally $\tilde{\nu}=0$, but some solvers can have problems with a zero value, in which case $\tilde{\nu} \leq \frac{\nu}{2}$ can be used.

This is if the trip term is used to "start up" the model. A convenient option is to set $\tilde{\nu}=5{\nu}$ in the freestream. The model then provides "Fully Turbulent" behavior, i.e., it becomes turbulent in any region that contains shear.

Outlet: convective outlet.
