= K–omega turbulence model =

Tool in computational fluid dynamics

In computational fluid dynamics, the k–omega (k–ω) turbulence model is a common two-equation turbulence model, that is used as an approximation for the Reynolds-averaged Navier–Stokes equations (RANS equations). The model attempts to predict turbulence by two partial differential equations for two variables, k and ω, with the first variable being the turbulence kinetic energy (k) while the second (ω) is the specific rate of dissipation (of the turbulence kinetic energy k into internal thermal energy).

== Standard (Wilcox) k–ω turbulence model ==
The eddy viscosity ν_{T}, as needed in the RANS equations, is given by: ν_{T} = k/ω, while the evolution of k and ω is modelled as:

$$\begin{align}
& \frac{\partial (\rho k)}{\partial t} + \frac{\partial (\rho u_j k)}{\partial x_j} = \rho P - \beta^* \rho \omega k + \frac{\partial}{\partial x_j} \left[\left(\mu + \sigma_k \frac{\rho k}{\omega} \right)\frac{\partial k}{\partial x_j}\right],
\qquad \text{with } P = \tau_{ij} \frac{\partial u_i}{\partial x_j},
\\
& \displaystyle \frac{\partial (\rho \omega)}{\partial t} + \frac{\partial (\rho u_j \omega)}{\partial x_j} = \frac{\alpha \omega}{k}\rho P - \beta \rho \omega^2 + \frac{\partial}{\partial x_j} \left[ \left( \mu + \sigma_{\omega} \frac{\rho k}{\omega} \right) \frac{\partial \omega}{\partial x_j} \right] + \frac{\rho \sigma_d}{\omega} \frac{\partial k}{\partial x_j} \frac{\partial \omega}{\partial x_j}.
\end{align}$$

For recommendations for the values of the different parameters, see Wilcox (2008).
