= Turbulence kinetic energy =

Mean kinetic energy per unit mass of eddies in turbulent flow

- Common symbols: TKE, k
- In SI base units: J/kg = m^{2}⋅s^{−2}
- Derivations from other quantities: $k = \frac{1}{2} \left(\, \overline{(u')^2} + \overline{(v')^2} + \overline{(w')^2} \,\right)$

In fluid dynamics, turbulence kinetic energy (TKE) is the mean kinetic energy per unit mass associated with eddies in turbulent flow. Physically, the turbulence kinetic energy is characterized by measured root-mean-square (RMS) velocity fluctuations. In the Reynolds-averaged Navier Stokes equations, the turbulence kinetic energy can be calculated based on the closure method, i.e. a turbulence model.

The TKE can be defined to be half the sum of the variances σ² (square of standard deviations σ) of the velocity components:
$$k = \frac12 (\sigma_u^2 + \sigma_v^2 + \sigma_w^2 ) = \frac12 \left(\, \overline{(u')^2} + \overline{(v')^2} + \overline{(w')^2} \,\right),$$
where each turbulent velocity component is the difference between the instantaneous and the average velocity: $u' = u - \overline{u}$ (Reynolds decomposition). The mean and variance are
$$\begin{align}
\overline{u'} &= \frac{1}{T} \int_0^T (u(t) - \overline{u}) \, dt = 0, \\[4pt]
\overline{(u')^2} & = \frac{1}{T}\int_0^T (u(t) - \overline{u})^2 \, dt  = \sigma_u^2 \geq 0,
\end{align}$$
respectively.

TKE can be produced by fluid shear, friction or buoyancy, or through external forcing at low-frequency eddy scales (integral scale). Turbulence kinetic energy is then transferred down the turbulence energy cascade, and is dissipated by viscous forces at the Kolmogorov scale. This process of production, transport and dissipation can be expressed as:
$$\frac{Dk}{Dt} + \nabla \cdot T' = P - \varepsilon,$$
where:

- $\tfrac{Dk}{Dt}$ is the mean-flow material derivative of TKE;
- ∇ · T′ is the turbulence transport of TKE;
- P is the production of TKE, and
- ε is the TKE dissipation.

Assuming that molecular viscosity is constant, and making the Boussinesq approximation, the TKE equation is:
$$\underbrace{ \frac{\partial k}{\partial t}}_{\text{Local} \atop \text{derivative}}
\!\!\! + \ \underbrace{\overline{u}_j \frac{\partial k}{\partial x_j}}_{\text{Advection} \atop {}}
= - \underbrace{ \frac{1}{\rho_o} \frac{\partial \overline{u'_i p'}}{\partial x_i} } _{\text{Pressure} \atop \text{diffusion}}
- \underbrace{ \frac{1}{2} \frac{\partial \overline{u_j' u_j' u_i'}}{\partial x_i} } _{{\text{Turbulent} \atop \text{transport}} \atop \mathcal{T}}
+ \underbrace{ \nu\frac{\partial^2 k}{\partial x^2_j} }_{ {\text{Molecular} \atop \text{viscous}} \atop \text{transport}}
- \underbrace{\overline{u'_i u'_j}\frac{\partial \overline{u_i}}{\partial x_j} } _{\text{Production} \atop \mathcal{P}}
- \underbrace{ \nu \overline{\frac{\partial u'_i}{\partial x_j}\frac{\partial u'_i}{\partial x_j}} } _{\text{Dissipation} \atop \varepsilon_k}
- \underbrace{ \frac{g}{\rho_o} \overline{\rho' u'_i}\delta_{i3} } _{\text{Buoyancy flux} \atop b}$$

By examining these phenomena, the turbulence kinetic energy budget for a particular flow can be found.

== Computational fluid dynamics ==
In computational fluid dynamics (CFD), it is impossible to numerically simulate turbulence without discretizing the flow-field as far as the Kolmogorov microscales, which is called direct numerical simulation (DNS). Because DNS simulations are exorbitantly expensive due to memory, computational and storage overheads, turbulence models are used to simulate the effects of turbulence. A variety of models are used, but generally TKE is a fundamental flow property which must be calculated in order for fluid turbulence to be modelled.

=== Reynolds-averaged Navier–Stokes equations ===
Reynolds-averaged Navier–Stokes (RANS) simulations use the Boussinesq eddy viscosity hypothesis to calculate the Reynolds stress that results from the averaging procedure:
$$\overline{u'_i u'_j} = \frac23 k \delta_{ij} - \nu_t \left( \frac{\partial \overline{u_i}}{\partial x_j} + \frac{\partial \overline{u_j}}{\partial x_i} \right),$$
where
$$\nu_t = c \cdot \sqrt{k} \cdot l_m.$$

The exact method of resolving TKE depends upon the turbulence model used; k–ε (k–epsilon) models assume isotropy of turbulence whereby the normal stresses are equal:
$$\overline{(u')^2} = \overline{(v')^2} = \overline{(w')^2}.$$

This assumption makes modelling of turbulence quantities (k and ε) simpler, but will not be accurate in scenarios where anisotropic behaviour of turbulence stresses dominates, and the implications of this in the production of turbulence also leads to over-prediction since the production depends on the mean rate of strain, and not the difference between the normal stresses (as they are, by assumption, equal).

Reynolds-stress models (RSM) use a different method to close the Reynolds stresses, whereby the normal stresses are not assumed isotropic, so the issue with TKE production is avoided.

=== Initial conditions ===
Accurate prescription of TKE as initial conditions in CFD simulations are important to accurately predict flows, especially in high Reynolds-number simulations. A smooth duct example is given below.
$$k = \frac32 ( U I )^2,$$
where I is the initial turbulence intensity [%] given below, and U is the initial velocity magnitude. As an example for pipe flows, with the Reynolds number based on the pipe diameter:
$$I = 0.16 Re^{-\frac{1}{8}}.$$

Here l is the turbulence or eddy length scale, given below, and c_{μ} is a k–ε model parameter whose value is typically given as 0.09;

$$\varepsilon = {c_\mu}^\frac34 k^\frac32 l^{-1}.$$

The turbulent length scale can be estimated as
$$l = 0.07L,$$
with L a characteristic length. For internal flows this may take the value of the inlet duct (or pipe) width (or diameter) or the hydraulic diameter.
