= Reynolds stress =

Concept in fluid mechanics

In fluid dynamics, the Reynolds stress is the component of the total stress tensor in a fluid obtained from the averaging operation over the Navier–Stokes equations to account for turbulent fluctuations in fluid momentum.

== Definition ==
The velocity field of a flow can be split into a mean part and a fluctuating part using Reynolds decomposition. We write

$$u_i = \overline{u_{i}} + u_{i}',\,$$

with $\mathbf{u}(\mathbf{x},t)$ being the flow velocity vector having components $u_i$ in the $x_i$ coordinate direction (with $x_i$ denoting the components of the coordinate vector $\mathbf{x}$). The mean velocities $\overline{u_i}$ are determined by either time averaging, spatial averaging or ensemble averaging, depending on the flow under study. Further $u'_i$ denotes the fluctuating (turbulence) part of the velocity.

We consider a homogeneous fluid, whose density ρ is taken to be a constant. For such a fluid, the components τ'_{ij} of the Reynolds stress tensor are defined as:

$$\tau'_{ij} \equiv \rho\,\overline{ u'_i\, u'_j},\,$$

Another – often used – definition, for constant density, of the Reynolds stress components is:

$$\tau''_{ij} \equiv \overline{u'_i\, u'_j},\,$$

which has the dimensions of velocity squared, instead of stress.

== Averaging and the Reynolds stress ==
To illustrate, Cartesian vector index notation is used. For simplicity, consider an incompressible fluid:

Given the fluid velocity $u_i$ as a function of position and time, write the average fluid velocity as $\overline{u_i}$, and the velocity fluctuation is $u'_i$. Then $u_i = \overline{u_i} + u'_i$.

The conventional ensemble rules of averaging are that

$$\begin{align}
\overline{\bar a}   &= \bar a, \\
\overline{a + b}    &= \bar a + \bar b, \\
\overline{a \bar b} &= \bar a \bar b.
\end{align}$$

One splits the Euler equations (fluid dynamics) or the Navier-Stokes equations into an average and a fluctuating part. One finds that upon averaging the fluid equations, a stress on the right hand side appears of the form $\rho \overline{ u'_i u'_j}$. This is the Reynolds stress, conventionally written $R_{ij}$:

$$R_{ij} \ \equiv\   \rho \overline{ u'_i u'_j}$$

The divergence of this stress is the force density on the fluid due to the turbulent fluctuations.

== Reynolds averaging of the Navier–Stokes equations ==
For instance, for an incompressible, viscous, Newtonian fluid, the continuity and momentum equations—the incompressible Navier–Stokes equations—can be written (in a non-conservative form) as

$$\frac{\partial u_i}{\partial x_i}=0,$$

and

$$\rho \frac{Du_i}{Dt} = -\frac{\partial p}{\partial x_i} + \mu \left(
\frac{\partial^2 u_i}{\partial x_j \partial x_j} \right),$$

where $D/Dt$ is the Lagrangian derivative or the substantial derivative,

$$\frac{D}{Dt} = \frac{\partial}{\partial t} + u_j \frac{\partial}{\partial x_j}.$$

Defining the flow variables above with a time-averaged component and a fluctuating component, the continuity and momentum equations become

$$\frac{\partial \left( \overline{u_i} + u_i' \right)}{\partial x_i} = 0,$$

and

$$\rho \left[ \frac{\partial \left( \overline{u_i} + u_i' \right)}{\partial t} + \left( \overline{u_j} + u_j' \right) \frac{\partial \left( \overline{u_i} + u_i' \right)}{\partial x_j} \right] = -\frac{\partial \left( \bar{p} + p' \right) }{\partial x_i} + \mu \left[ \frac{\partial^2 \left( \overline{u_i} + u_i' \right)}{\partial x_j \partial x_j} \right].$$

Examining one of the terms on the left hand side of the momentum equation, it is seen that

$$\left( \overline{u_j} + u_j' \right) \frac{\partial \left( \overline{u_i} + u_i' \right)}{\partial x_j} = \frac{\partial \left( \overline{u_i} + u_i' \right) \left( \overline{u_j} +
u_j' \right)}{\partial x_j} - \left( \overline{u_i} + u_i' \right) \frac{\partial \left( \overline{u_j} + u_j' \right)}{\partial x_j},$$

where the last term on the right hand side vanishes as a result of the continuity equation. Accordingly, the momentum equation becomes

$$\rho \left[ \frac{\partial \left( \overline{u_i} + u_i' \right)}{\partial t} + \frac{\partial \left( \overline{u_i} + u_i' \right) \left( \overline{u_j} + u_j' \right) }{\partial x_j} \right] =
-\frac{\partial \left( \bar{p} + p' \right) }{\partial x_i} + \mu \left[ \frac{\partial^2 \left( \overline{u_i} + u_i' \right)}{\partial x_j \partial x_j} \right].$$

Now the continuity and momentum equations will be averaged. The ensemble rules of averaging need to be employed, keeping in mind that the average of products of fluctuating quantities will not in general vanish. After averaging, the continuity and momentum equations become

$$\frac{\partial \overline{u_i}}{\partial x_i} = 0,$$

and

$$\rho \left[ \frac{\partial \overline{u_i}}{\partial t} + \frac{\partial \overline{u_i}\, \overline{u_j}}{\partial x_j} + \frac{\partial \overline{u_i' u_j'}}{\partial x_j} \right] =  -\frac{\partial \bar{p}}{\partial x_i} + \mu \frac{\partial^2 \overline{u_i}}{\partial x_j \partial
x_j}.$$

Using the product rule on one of the terms of the left hand side, it is revealed that

$$\frac{\partial \overline{u_i}\, \overline{u_j}}{\partial x_j} = \overline{u_j} \frac{\partial \overline{u_i}}{\partial x_j} + \overline{u_i} {\frac{\partial \overline{u_j}}{\partial x_j}},$$

where the last term on the right hand side vanishes as a result of the averaged continuity equation. The averaged momentum equation now becomes, after a rearrangement:

$$\rho \left[ \frac{\partial \overline{u_i}}{\partial t} + \overline{u_j} \frac{\partial \overline{u_i}}{\partial x_j} \right] = - \frac{\partial \bar{p}}{\partial x_i} + \frac{\partial}{\partial x_j} \left( \mu \frac{\partial \overline{u_i}}{\partial x_j} - \rho \overline{u_i' u_j'} \right),$$

where the Reynolds stresses, $\rho \overline{u_i' u_j'}$, are collected with the viscous normal and shear stress terms, $\mu \frac{\partial \overline{u_i}}{\partial x_j}$.

== Discussion ==
The time evolution equation of Reynolds stress was first given by Eq.(1.6) in Zhou Peiyuan's paper. The equation in modern form is
$$\underbrace{\frac{\partial \overline{u_i^\prime u_j^\prime}}{\partial t}}_{\rm storage}
+\!\! \underbrace{\bar{u}_k \frac{\partial \overline{u_i^\prime u_j^\prime}}{\partial x_k}}_{\rm mean~advection} =
-\ \underbrace{\overline{u_i^\prime u_k^\prime}\frac{\partial \bar{u}_j}{\partial  x_k}
- \overline{u_j^\prime u_k^\prime}\frac{\partial \bar{u}_i}{\partial  x_k}}_{\rm shear~production}
+  \underbrace{\overline{ \frac{p^\prime}{\rho}\left( \frac{\partial u_i^\prime}{\partial  x_j}
+\frac{\partial u_j^\prime}{\partial  x_i}  \right) }}_{\rm pressure-scrambling}
- \underbrace{\frac{\partial }{\partial  x_k} \left( \overline{u_i^\prime u_j^\prime u_k^\prime}
+ \frac{\overline{p^\prime u_i^\prime } }{\rho} \delta_{jk}
+ \frac{\overline{p^\prime u_j^\prime } }{\rho} \delta_{ik}
- \nu \frac{\partial \overline{u_i^\prime u_j^\prime}}{\partial x_k}    \right)}_{\rm transport~terms}
-2 \nu \overline{\frac{\partial u_i^\prime}{\partial  x_k} \frac{\partial u_j^\prime}{\partial  x_k}},$$
where $\nu$ is the kinematic viscosity, and the last term $\nu \overline{\tfrac{\partial u_i^\prime}{\partial x_k} \tfrac{\partial u_j^\prime}{\partial x_k}}$ is turbulent dissipation rate. This equation is very complex. If $\overline{u_i^\prime u_j^\prime}$ is traced, turbulence kinetic energy is obtained. The pressure-scrambling term is so called because this term (also called the pressure-strain covariance) is traceless under the assumption of incompressibility, meaning it cannot create or destroy turbulence kinetic energy but can only mix it between the three components of velocity. Depending on the application, this equation can also include buoyant production terms (proportional to the gravitational acceleration $g$) and Coriolis production terms (proportional to the Earth's rotation rate); these would be present in atmospheric applications, for example.

The question then is, what is the value of the Reynolds stress? This has been the subject of intense modeling and interest, for roughly the past century. The problem is recognized as a closure problem, akin to the problem of closure in the BBGKY hierarchy. A transport equation for the Reynolds stress may be found by taking the outer product of the fluid equations for the fluctuating velocity, with itself.

One finds that the transport equation for the Reynolds stress includes terms with higher-order correlations (specifically, the triple correlation $\overline{v'_i v'_j v'_k}$) as well as correlations with pressure fluctuations (i.e. momentum carried by sound waves). A common solution is to model these terms by simple ad hoc prescriptions.

The theory of the Reynolds stress is quite analogous to the kinetic theory of gases, and indeed the stress tensor in a fluid at a point may be seen to be the ensemble average of the stress due to the thermal velocities of molecules at a given point in a fluid. Thus, by analogy, the Reynolds stress is sometimes thought of as consisting of an isotropic pressure part, termed the turbulent pressure, and an off-diagonal part which may be thought of as an effective turbulent viscosity.

In fact, while much effort has been expended in developing good models for the Reynolds stress in a fluid, as a practical matter, when solving the fluid equations using computational fluid dynamics, often the simplest turbulence models prove the most effective. One class of models, closely related to the concept of turbulent viscosity, are the k-epsilon turbulence models, based upon coupled transport equations for the turbulent energy density $k$ (similar to the turbulent pressure, i.e. the trace of the Reynolds stress) and the turbulent dissipation rate $\epsilon$.

Typically, the average is formally defined as an ensemble average as in statistical ensemble theory. However, as a practical matter, the average may also be thought of as a spatial average over some length scale, or a temporal average. Note that, while formally the connection between such averages is justified in equilibrium statistical mechanics by the ergodic theorem, the statistical mechanics of hydrodynamic turbulence is currently far from understood. In fact, the Reynolds stress at any given point in a turbulent fluid is somewhat subject to interpretation, depending upon how one defines the average.
