= Acoustic resonance spectroscopy =

Acoustic resonance spectroscopy (ARS) is a method of spectroscopy in the acoustic region, primarily the sonic and ultrasonic regions. ARS is typically much more rapid than HPLC and NIR. It is non destructive and requires no sample preparation, as the sampling waveguide can simply be pushed into a sample powder/liquid or in contact with a solid sample.

To date, the AR spectrometer has successfully differentiated and quantified sample analytes in various forms, namely tablets, powders, and liquids. It has been used to measure and monitor the progression of chemical reactions, such as the setting and hardening of concrete from cement paste to solid. Acoustic spectrometry has also been used to measure the volume fraction of colloids in a dispersion medium, as well as for the investigation of physical properties of colloidal dispersions, such as aggregation and particle size distribution. Typically, these experiments are carried out with sinusoidal excitation signals and the experimental observation of signal attenuation. From a comparison of theoretical attenuation to experimental observation, the particle size distribution and aggregation phenomena are inferred.

== History ==
Dipen Sinha of the Los Alamos National Laboratory developed ARS in 1989. Most published work in acoustics has been in the ultrasonic region and their instrumentation has dealt with propagation through a medium and not a resonance effect. One of the first, if not the first publication related to acoustic resonance was in 1988 in the journal of Applied Spectroscopy. The researchers designed a V-shaped quartz rod instrument that utilized ultrasonic waves to obtain signatures of microliters of different liquids. The researchers did not have any type of classification statistics or identification protocols; the researchers simply observed ultrasonic resonance signatures with these different materials. Specifically, Sinha was working on developing an ARS instrument that can detect nuclear, chemical, and biological weapons. By 1996, he had successfully developed a portable ARS unit that can be used in a battlefield. The unit can detect and identify deadly chemicals that are stored in containers in matter of minutes. In addition, the instrument was further developed by a different research group (Dr. Robert Lodder, University of Kentucky) and their work was also published in Applied Spectroscopy. The researchers created a V-shaped instrument that could breach the sonic and ultrasonic regions creating more versatility. The term acoustic resonance spectrometer was coined for the V-shaped spectrometer as well. Since the study in 1994, the ARS has evolved and been used to differentiate wood species, differentiate pharmaceutical tablets, determine burn rates and determine dissolution rates of tablets. In 2007 Analytical Chemistry featured the past and current work of the lab of Dr. Lodder discussing the potential of acoustics in the analytical chemistry and engineering fields.

== Theory ==
=== Vibrations ===
There are two main types of vibrations: free and forced. Free vibrations are the natural or normal modes of vibration for a substance. Forced vibrations are caused by some sort of excitation to make the analyte resonate beyond its normal modes. ARS employs forced vibrations upon the analyte unlike most commonly used techniques which use free vibrations to measure the analyte. ARS excites multiple normal modes by sweeping the excitation frequency of an analyte with no internal vibrations to obtain a resonance spectrum. These resonance frequencies greatly depend on the type of analyte being measured and also depend greatly on the physical properties of the analyte itself (mass, shape, size, etc.). The physical properties will greatly influence the range of frequencies produced by the resonating analyte. In general small analytes have megahertz frequencies while larger analytes can be only a few hundred hertz. The more complex the analyte the more complex the resonance spectrum.

=== Quartz Rod ===
The ARS is essentially set up to create a fingerprint for different samples by constructive and destructive interferences. Figure 1 is a schematic of the quartz rod ARS which illustrates the path of the sound through the quartz rod. A function generator is the source though any device that is capable of outputting sound in voltage form could be used (i.e. CD player, MP3 player or sound card). White noise is generated and the voltage is converted into a sound wave by a piezoelectric disc coupled to the quartz rod. The sound resonates down the quartz rod which is shown as a blue sinusoidal wave and two key interactions occur. A portion of the energy (red) is introduced into the sample and interacts in a specific manner dependent of the sample and another portion of the energy (blue) continues unaltered through the quartz rod. The two energies will still have the same frequency though they will have changes in their phase and possibly amplitude. The two waves recombine after the sample and constructive or destructive interference occurs depending on the phase shift and amplitude change due to the sample. The altered combined energy is converted to an electrical voltage by another piezoelectric disc at the end of the quartz rod. The voltage is then recorded onto a computer by a sound card. The sample is coupled to the quartz rod at constant pressure which is monitored by a pressure transducer which also acts as the sample holder. Rubber grommets are used to secure the quartz rod to a stable stand minimizing coupling of the rod to the surroundings. Broadband white noise is used to obtain a full spectrum; however, most sound cards only pick up between 20 and 22,050 Hz. The waveform that is sent to the computer is a time-based signal of the interactions of white noise with the sample. Fast Fourier transform (FFT) is performed on the waveform to transform the time-based signal into the more useful frequency spectrum.

== Detection limits ==
A multidimensional population translation experiment was utilized to determine the detection limits of an ARS device, Populations with small multidimensional separation, in this case aspirin and ibuprofen, were used to determine that tablets with a 0.08 mm difference in thickness, 0.0046 g mass difference, and a difference in density of 0.01658 g/mL were not separable by ARS. Using vitamin C and acetaminophen for the largest multidimensional separation, tablets with a thickness difference of 0.27 mm, 0.0756 g mass difference, and 0.01157 g/mL density difference in density were inseparable. Experimentally the dynamic range of ARS is a factor of ten.

== Applications ==
One potential application of ARS involves the rapid and nondestructive identification of drug tablet verification. Currently, there are no unfailing methods to eliminate contaminated or mislabeled products, a process which sometimes results in millions of pills having to be recalled. More studies need to be completed to determine if ARS could be used as a process analytical technique in industry to prevent problems with pills before they are shipped. ARS may also be useful for quantifying the active ingredient in pharmaceutical ointments and gels.
