= Acoustic spectroscopy =

Acoustic spectroscopy may refer to:

- Spectrogrammetry; plotting the energy versus frequency over time
- Ultrasound attenuation spectroscopy, instead of energy, the attenuation coefficient is measured versus frequency
- Acoustic resonance spectroscopy, using forced vibrations to excite multiple normal modes to obtain a resonance spectrum
