= Strain rate =

Rate of change in the linear deformation of a material with respect to time

- In SI base units: s^{−1}
- Dimension: $\mathsf{T}^{-1}$

Yield stress increases as strain rate increases.

In mechanics and materials science, strain rate is the time derivative of strain of a material. Strain rate has dimension of inverse time and SI units of inverse second, s^{−1} (or its multiples).

The strain rate at some point within the material measures the rate at which the distances of adjacent parcels of the material change with time in the neighborhood of that point. It comprises both the rate at which the material is expanding or shrinking (expansion rate), and also the rate at which it is being deformed by progressive shearing without changing its volume (shear rate). It is zero if these distances do not change, as happens when all particles in some region are moving with the same velocity (same speed and direction) and/or rotating with the same angular velocity, as if that part of the medium were a rigid body.

The strain rate is a concept of materials science and continuum mechanics that plays an essential role in the physics of fluids and deformable solids. In an isotropic Newtonian fluid, in particular, the viscous stress is a linear function of the rate of strain, defined by two coefficients, one relating to the expansion rate (the bulk viscosity coefficient) and one relating to the shear rate (the "ordinary" viscosity coefficient). In solids, higher strain rates can often cause normally ductile materials to fail in a brittle manner.

== Definition ==
The definition of strain rate was first introduced in 1867 by American metallurgist Jade LeCocq, who defined it as "the rate at which strain occurs. It is the time rate of change of strain." In physics the strain rate is generally defined as the derivative of the strain with respect to time. Its precise definition depends on how strain is measured.

The strain is the ratio of two lengths, so it is a dimensionless quantity (a number that does not depend on the choice of measurement units). Thus, strain rate has dimension of inverse time and units of inverse second, s^{−1} (or its multiples).

== Simple deformations ==
In simple contexts, a single number may suffice to describe the strain, and therefore the strain rate. For example, when a long and uniform rubber band is gradually stretched by pulling at the ends, the strain can be defined as the ratio $\epsilon$ between the amount of stretching and the original length of the band:

$$\epsilon(t) = \frac{L(t) - L_0}{L_0}$$

where $L_0$ is the original length and $L(t)$ its length at each time $t$. For example, if the rubber band starts at original length of 1 cm and after stretching some time $t$ the length is 7 cm, the strain at that time will be 6 (a unitless number). Then the strain rate will be

$$\dot {\epsilon}(t) = \frac {d \epsilon} {dt} = \frac {d}{dt} \left ( \frac{L(t) - L_0}{L_0} \right ) = \frac{1}{L_0} \frac{dL(t)}{dt} = \frac{v(t)}{L_0}$$

where $v(t)$ is the speed at which the ends are moving away from each other. To continue the above example, assuming the speed at which the ends were moving away from each other was constant and the stretch occurred over 2 seconds, the strain rate would be 3 s^{−1}.

The strain rate can also be expressed by a single number when the material is being subjected to parallel shear without change of volume; namely, when the deformation can be described as a set of infinitesimally thin parallel layers sliding against each other as if they were rigid sheets, in the same direction, without changing their spacing. This description fits the laminar flow of a fluid between two solid plates that slide parallel to each other (a Couette flow) or inside a circular pipe of constant cross-section (a Poiseuille flow). In those cases, the state of the material at some time $t$ can be described by the displacement $X(y,t)$ of each layer, since an arbitrary starting time, as a function of its distance $y$ from the fixed wall. Then the strain in each layer can be expressed as the limit of the ratio between the current relative displacement $X(y+d,t) - X(y,t)$ of a nearby layer, divided by the spacing $d$ between the layers:

$$\epsilon(y,t) = \lim_{d\rightarrow 0} \frac{X(y+d,t) - X(y,t)}{d} = \frac{\partial X}{\partial y}(y,t)$$

Therefore, the strain rate is

$$\dot \epsilon(y,t) = \left(\frac{\partial}{\partial t}\frac{\partial X}{\partial y}\right)(y,t) = \left(\frac{\partial}{\partial y}\frac{\partial X}{\partial t}\right)(y,t) = \frac{\partial V}{\partial y}(y,t)$$

where $V(y,t)$ is the current linear speed of the material at distance $y$ from the wall.

== The strain-rate tensor ==
In more general situations, when the material is being deformed in various directions at different rates, the strain (and therefore the strain rate) around a point within a material cannot be expressed by a single number, or even by a single vector. In such cases, the rate of deformation must be expressed by a tensor, a linear map between vectors, that expresses how the relative velocity of the medium changes when one moves by a small distance away from the point in a given direction. This strain rate tensor can be defined as the time derivative of the strain tensor, or as the symmetric part of the gradient (derivative with respect to position) of the velocity of the material.

With a chosen coordinate system, the strain rate tensor can be represented by a symmetric 3×3 matrix of real numbers. The strain rate tensor typically varies with position and time within the material, and is therefore a (time-varying) tensor field. It only describes the local rate of deformation to first order; but that is generally sufficient for most purposes, even when the viscosity of the material is highly non-linear.

== Strain rate testing ==
Materials can be tested using the so-called epsilon dot ($\dot{\varepsilon}$) method which can be used to derive viscoelastic parameters through lumped parameter analysis.

== Sliding rate or shear strain rate ==
Similarly, the sliding rate, also called the deviatoric strain rate or shear strain rate is the derivative with respect to time of the shear strain. Engineering sliding strain can be defined as the angular displacement created by an applied shear stress, $\tau$.

$$\gamma = \frac{w}{l} = \tan(\theta)$$

Uniaxial engineering shear strain

Therefore the unidirectional sliding strain rate can be defined as:

$$\dot{\gamma}=\frac{d\gamma}{dt}$$

== See also ==
- Flow velocity
- Strain
- Strain gauge
- Stress–strain curve
- Stretch ratio
