= Ultrasound =

Sound waves with frequencies above the human hearing range

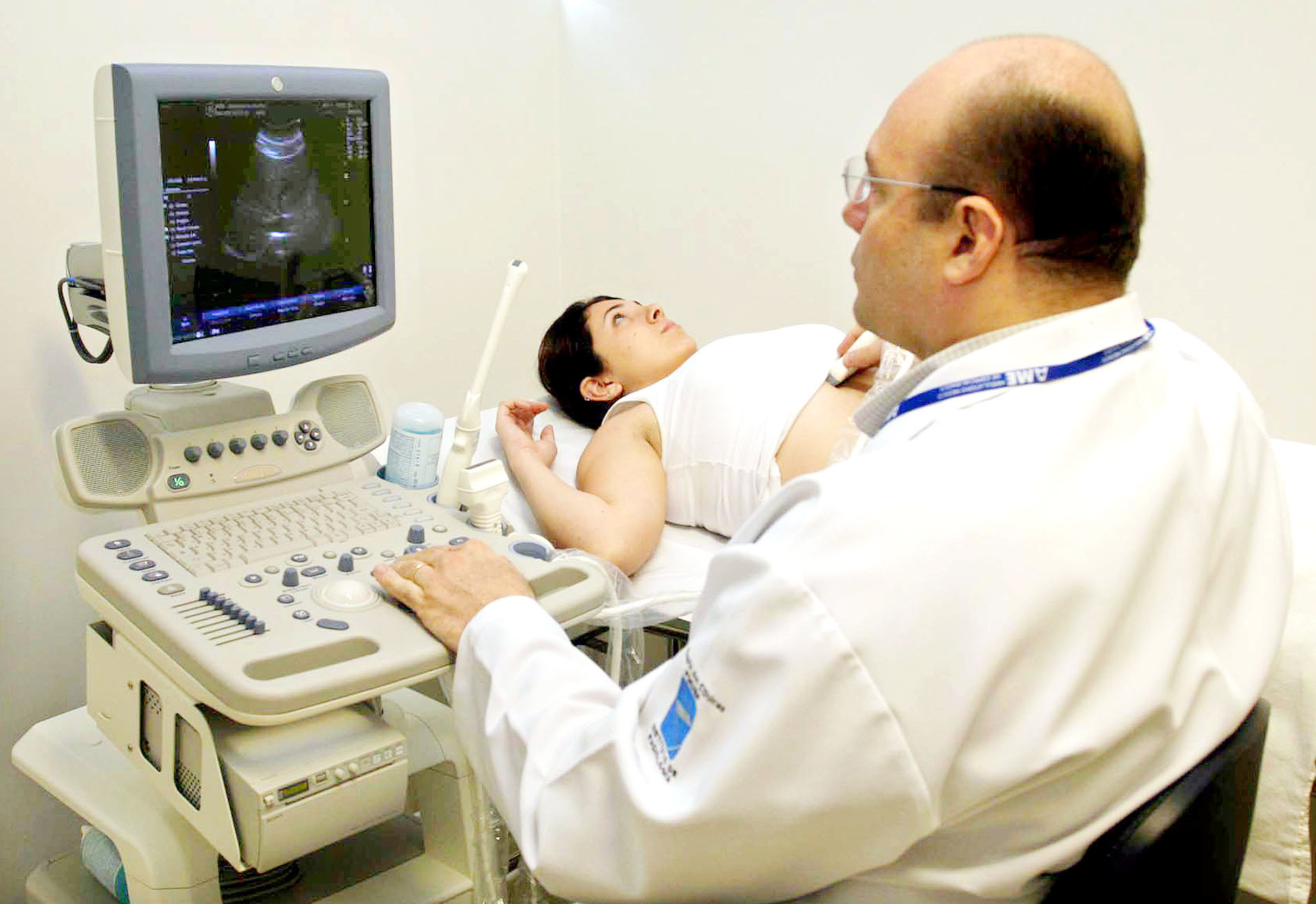
An ultrasonic examination

Ultrasound is sound with frequencies greater than 20 kilohertz. This frequency is the approximate upper audible limit of human hearing in healthy young adults. The physical principles of acoustic waves apply to any frequency range, including ultrasound. Ultrasonic devices operate with frequencies from 20 kHz up to several gigahertz.

Ultrasound is used in many different fields. Ultrasonic devices are used to detect objects and measure distances. Ultrasound imaging or sonography is often used in medicine. In the nondestructive testing of products and structures, ultrasound is used to detect invisible flaws. Industrially, ultrasound is used for cleaning, mixing, and accelerating chemical processes. Animals such as bats and porpoises use ultrasound for locating prey and obstacles.

== History ==
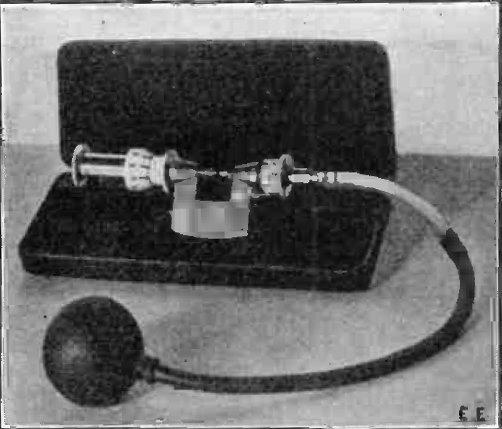
Galton whistle, one of the first devices to produce ultrasound

Acoustics, the science of sound, starts as far back as Pythagoras in the 6th century BC, who wrote on the mathematical properties of stringed instruments. Echolocation in bats was discovered by Lazzaro Spallanzani in 1794, when he demonstrated that bats hunted and navigated by inaudible sound, not vision. Francis Galton in 1893 invented the Galton whistle, an adjustable whistle that produced ultrasound, which he used to measure the hearing range of humans and other animals, demonstrating that many animals could hear sounds above the hearing range of humans.

The first article on the history of ultrasound was written in 1948. According to its author, during the First World War, a Russian engineer named Chilowski submitted an idea for submarine detection to the French Government. The latter invited Paul Langevin, then Director of the School of Physics and Chemistry in Paris, to evaluate it. Chilowski's proposal was to excite a cylindrical, mica condenser by a high-frequency Poulsen arc at approximately 100 kHz and thus to generate an ultrasound beam for detecting submerged objects. The idea of locating underwater obstacles had been suggested prior by L. F. Richardson, following the Titanic disaster. Richardson had proposed to position a high-frequency hydraulic whistle at the focus of a mirror and use the beam for locating submerged navigational hazards. A prototype was built by Sir Charles Parsons, the inventor of the vapour turbine, but the device was found not to be suitable for this purpose. Langevin's device made use of the piezoelectric effect, which he had been acquainted with whilst a student at the laboratory of Jacques and Pierre Curie. Langevin calculated and built an ultrasound transducer comprising a thin sheet of quartz sandwiched between two steel plates. Langevin was the first to report cavitation-related bioeffects from ultrasound.

== Definition ==
Approximate frequency ranges corresponding to ultrasound, with rough guide of some applications

Ultrasound is defined by the American National Standards Institute as "sound at frequencies greater than 20 kHz". In air at atmospheric pressure, ultrasonic waves have wavelengths of 1.9 cm or less.

Ultrasound can be generated at very high frequencies; ultrasound is used for sonochemistry at frequencies up to multiple hundreds of kilohertz. Medical imaging equipment uses frequencies in the MHz range. UHF ultrasound waves have been generated as high as the gigahertz range.

Characterizing extremely high-frequency ultrasound poses challenges, as such rapid movement causes waveforms to steepen and form shock waves.

== Perception ==
=== Humans ===
The upper frequency limit in humans (approximately 20 kHz) is due to limitations of the middle ear. Auditory sensation can occur if high‐intensity ultrasound is fed directly into the human skull and reaches the cochlea through bone conduction, without passing through the middle ear.

Children can hear some high-pitched sounds that older adults cannot hear, because in humans the upper limit pitch of hearing tends to decrease with age. An American cell phone company has used this to create ring signals that supposedly are only audible to younger humans, but many older people can hear the signals, which may be because of the considerable variation of age-related deterioration in the upper hearing threshold.

=== Animals ===
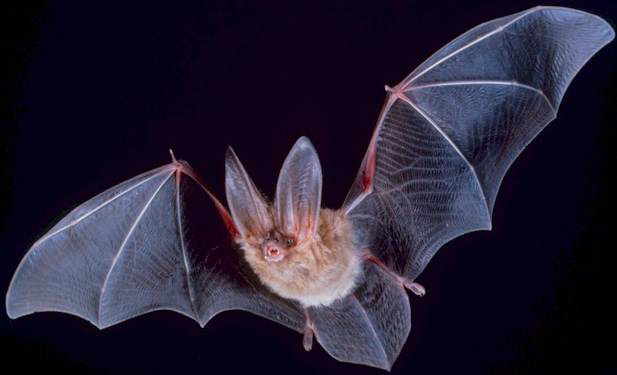
Bats use ultrasounds to navigate in the darkness.

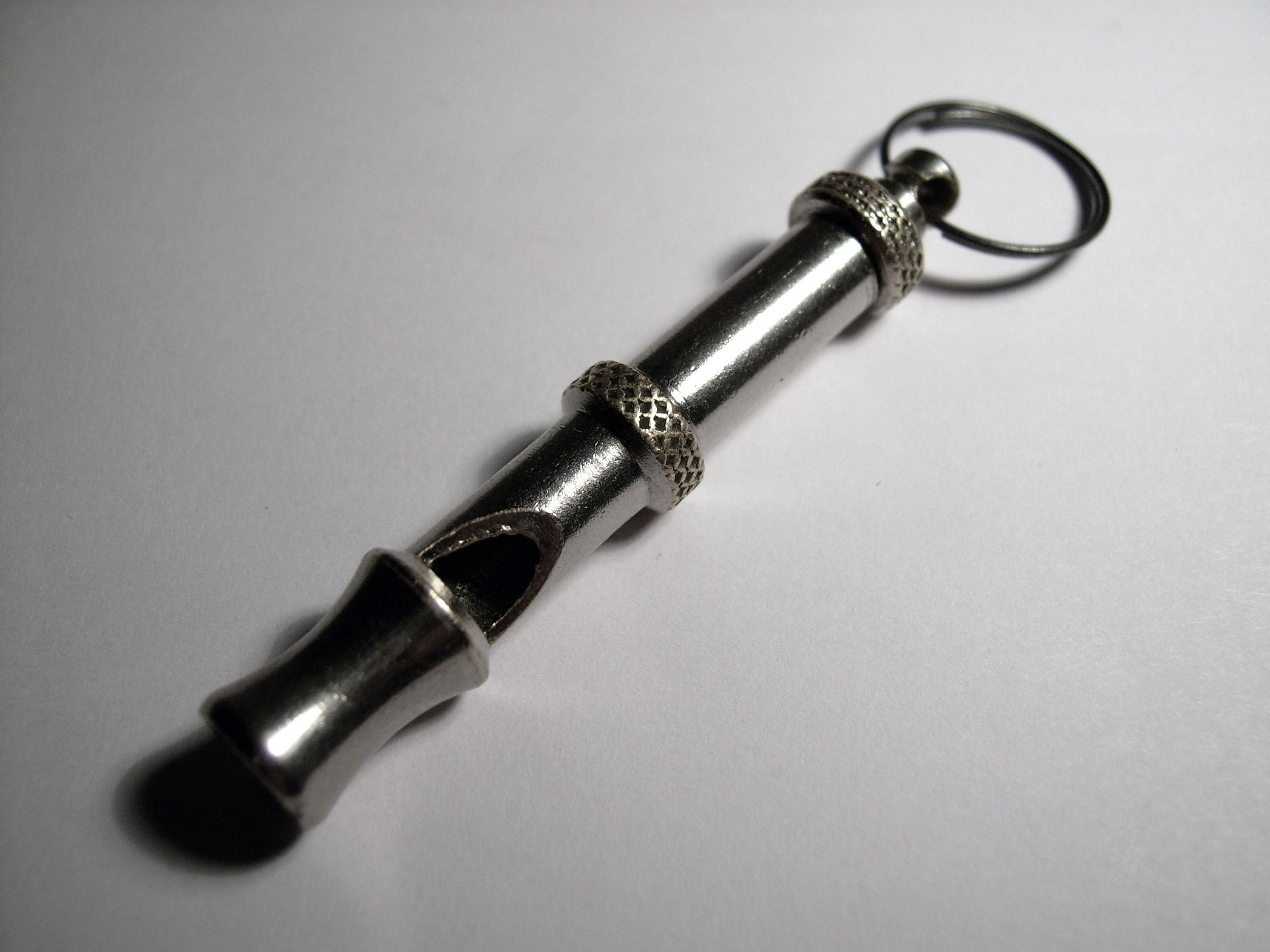
A dog whistle, which emits sound in the ultrasonic range, used to train dogs and other animals

Bats use a variety of ultrasonic ranging (echolocation) techniques to detect their prey. They can detect frequencies beyond 100 kHz, possibly up to 200 kHz.

Many insects have good ultrasonic hearing, and most of these are nocturnal insects listening for echolocating bats. These include many groups of moths, beetles, praying mantises and lacewings. Upon hearing a bat, some insects will make evasive manoeuvres to escape being caught. Ultrasonic frequencies trigger a reflex action in the noctuid moth that causes it to drop slightly in its flight to evade attack. Tiger moths also emit clicks which may disturb bats' echolocation, and in other cases may advertise the fact that they are poisonous by emitting sound.

Dogs and cats' hearing range extends into the ultrasound; the top end of a dog's hearing range is about 45 kHz, while a cat's is 64 kHz. The wild ancestors of cats and dogs evolved this higher hearing range to hear high-frequency sounds made by their preferred prey, small rodents. A dog whistle is a whistle that emits ultrasound, used for training and calling dogs. The frequency of most dog whistles is within the range of 23 to 54 kHz.

Toothed whales, including dolphins, can hear ultrasound and use such sounds in their navigational system (biosonar) to orient and to capture prey. Porpoises have the highest known upper hearing limit at around 160 kHz. Several types of fish can detect ultrasound. In the order Clupeiformes, members of the subfamily Alosinae (shad) have been shown to be able to detect sounds up to 180 kHz, while the other subfamilies (e.g. herrings) can hear only up to 4 kHz.

No bird species have been reported to be sensitive to ultrasound.

Commercial ultrasonic systems have been sold for supposed indoors electronic pest control and outdoors ultrasonic algae control. However, no scientific evidence exists on the success of such devices for these purposes.

== Detection and ranging ==
=== Non-contact sensor ===
An ultrasonic level or sensing system requires no contact with the target. For many processes in the medical, pharmaceutical, military and general industries this is an advantage over inline sensors that may contaminate the liquids inside a vessel or tube or that may be clogged by the product.

Both continuous wave and pulsed systems are used. The principle behind a pulsed-ultrasonic technology is that the transmit signal consists of short bursts of ultrasonic energy. After each burst, the electronics looks for a return signal within a small window of time corresponding to the time it takes for the energy to pass through the vessel. Only a signal received during this window will qualify for additional signal processing.

A popular consumer application of ultrasonic ranging was the Polaroid SX-70 camera, which included a lightweight transducer system to focus the camera automatically. Polaroid later licensed this ultrasound technology and it became the basis of a variety of ultrasonic products.

=== Motion sensors and flow measurement ===
A common ultrasound application is an automatic door opener, where an ultrasonic sensor detects a person's approach and opens the door. Ultrasonic sensors are also used to detect intruders; the ultrasound can cover a wide area from a single point. The flow in pipes or open channels can be measured by ultrasonic flowmeters, which measure the average velocity of flowing liquid.

In rheology, an acoustic rheometer relies on analysing the propagation of ultrasound to determine a fluid's viscosity.

In fluid mechanics, fluid flow can be measured using an ultrasonic flow meter based on the Doppler effect.

=== Nondestructive testing ===
Principle of flaw detection with ultrasound. A void in the solid material reflects some energy back to the transducer, which is detected and displayed.

Ultrasonic testing is a type of nondestructive testing commonly used to find flaws in materials and to measure the thickness of objects. Frequencies of 2 to 10 MHz are common, but for special purposes other frequencies are used. Inspection may be manual or automated and is an essential part of modern manufacturing processes. Most metals can be inspected as well as plastics and aerospace composites. Lower frequency ultrasound (50–500 kHz) can also be used to inspect less dense materials such as wood, concrete and cement.

Ultrasound inspection of welded joints has been an alternative to radiography for nondestructive testing since the 1960s. Ultrasonic inspection eliminates the use of ionizing radiation, with safety and cost benefits. Ultrasound can also provide additional information such as the depth of flaws in a welded joint. Ultrasonic inspection has progressed from manual methods to computerized systems that automate much of the process. An ultrasonic test of a joint can identify the existence of flaws, measure their size, and identify their location. Not all welded materials are equally amenable to ultrasonic inspection; some materials have a large grain size that produces a high level of background noise in measurements.

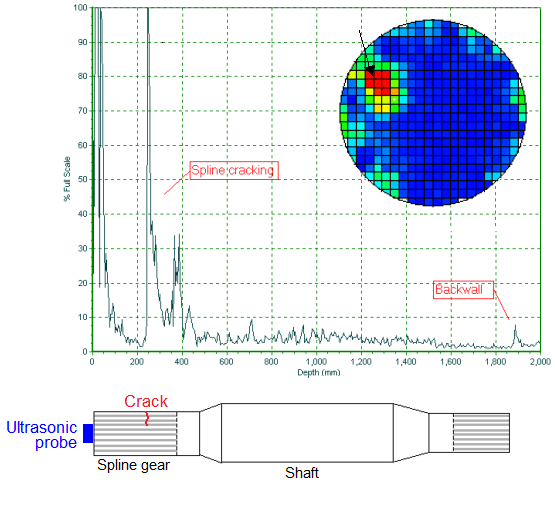
Non-destructive testing of a swing shaft showing spline cracking

Ultrasonic thickness measurement is one technique used to monitor quality of welds.

=== Ultrasonic range finding ===
Principle of an active sonar

A common use of ultrasound is in underwater range finding; this use is also called sonar. An ultrasonic pulse is generated in a particular direction. If there is an object in the path of this pulse, part or all of the pulse will be reflected back to the transmitter as an echo and can be detected through the receiver path. By measuring the difference in time between the pulse being transmitted and the echo being received, it is possible to determine the distance.

The measured travel time of Sonar pulses in water is strongly dependent on the temperature and the salinity of the water. Ultrasonic ranging is also applied for measurement in air and for short distances. For example, hand-held ultrasonic measuring tools can rapidly measure the layout of rooms.

Although range finding underwater is performed at both sub-audible and audible frequencies for great distances (1 to several kilometres), ultrasonic range finding is used when distances are shorter and the accuracy of the distance measurement is desired to be better. Ultrasonic measurements may be limited through barrier layers with large salinity, temperature or vortex differences. Ranging in water varies from about hundreds to thousands of meters, but can be performed with centimetres to meters for accuracy.

=== Ultrasound Identification (USID) ===
Ultrasound Identification (USID) is a Real-Time Locating System (RTLS) or Indoor Positioning System (IPS) technology used to automatically track and identify the location of objects in real time using simple, inexpensive nodes (badges/tags) attached to or embedded in objects and devices, which then transmit an ultrasound signal to communicate their location to microphone sensors.

== Imaging ==
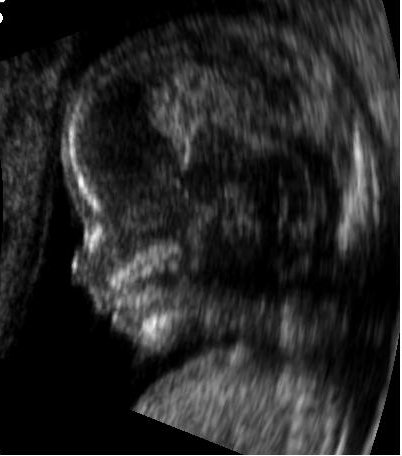
Sonogram of a fetus at 14 weeks (profile)

An explanatory video about medical ultrasound technology by the U.S. National Institute of Biomedical Imaging and Bioengineering.

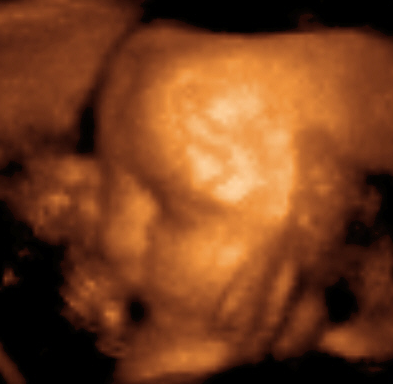
Head of a fetus, aged 29 weeks, in a "3D ultrasound"

The potential for ultrasonic imaging of objects, in which a 3 GHz sound wave could produce resolution comparable to an optical image, was recognized by Sergei Sokolov in 1939. Such frequencies were not possible at the time, and what technology did exist produced relatively low-contrast images with poor sensitivity. Ultrasonic imaging uses frequencies of 2 megahertz and higher; the shorter wavelength allows resolution of small internal details in structures and tissues. The power density is generally less than 1 watt per square centimetre to avoid heating and cavitation effects in the object under examination. Ultrasonic imaging applications include industrial nondestructive testing, quality control and medical uses. Imaging can be viewed as ranging with added angular information.

=== Acoustic microscopy ===
Acoustic microscopy is the technique of using sound waves to visualize structures too small to be resolved by the human eye. High and ultra high frequencies up to several gigahertz are used in acoustic microscopes. The reflection and diffraction of sound waves from microscopic structures can yield information not available with light.

=== Human medicine ===
Medical ultrasound is an ultrasound-based diagnostic medical imaging technique used to visualize muscles, tendons, and many internal organs to capture their size, structure and any pathological lesions with real time tomographic images. Ultrasound has been used by radiologists and sonographers to image the human body for at least 50 years and has become a widely used diagnostic tool. The technology is relatively inexpensive and portable, especially when compared with other techniques, such as magnetic resonance imaging (MRI) and computed tomography (CT).

Ultrasound is also used to visualize fetuses during routine and emergency prenatal care. Such diagnostic applications used during pregnancy are referred to as obstetric sonography. Ultrasound is also increasingly being used in trauma and first aid cases, with emergency ultrasound being used by some EMT response teams. Furthermore, ultrasound is used in remote diagnosis cases where teleconsultation is required, such as scientific experiments in space or mobile sports team diagnosis, as the equipment is more portable compared to other imaging methods.

According to RadiologyInfo, ultrasounds are useful in the detection of pelvic abnormalities and can involve techniques known as abdominal (transabdominal) ultrasound, vaginal (transvaginal or endovaginal) ultrasound in women, and also rectal (transrectal) ultrasound in men.

In Doppler ultrasonography, the speed of objects is measured along with their positions. This is especially useful for analysing blood flow in the heart (Doppler echocardiography).

As currently applied in the medical field, properly performed ultrasound poses no known risks to the patient. Sonography does not use ionizing radiation, and the power levels used for imaging are too low to cause adverse heating or pressure effects in tissue. Although the long-term effects due to ultrasound exposure at diagnostic intensity are still unknown, currently most doctors feel that the benefits to patients outweigh the risks. The ALARA (As Low As Reasonably Achievable) principle has been advocated for an ultrasound examination – that is, keeping the scanning time and power settings as low as possible but consistent with diagnostic imaging – and that by that principle nonmedical uses, which by definition are not necessary, are actively discouraged.

=== Veterinary medicine ===
Diagnostic ultrasound is used externally in horses for evaluation of soft tissue and tendon injuries, and internally in particular for reproductive work – evaluation of the reproductive tract of the mare and pregnancy detection. It may also be used in an external manner in stallions for evaluation of testicular condition and diameter as well as internally for reproductive evaluation (deferent duct etc.).

By 2005, ultrasound technology began to be used by the beef cattle industry to improve animal health and the yield of cattle operations. Ultrasound is used to evaluate fat thickness, rib eye area, and intramuscular fat in living animals. It is also used to evaluate the health and characteristics of unborn calves.

Ultrasound technology provides a means for cattle producers to obtain information that can be used to improve the breeding and husbandry of cattle. The technology can be expensive, and it requires a substantial time commitment for continuous data collection and operator training. Nevertheless, this technology has proven useful in managing and running a cattle breeding operation.

== Processing and power ==
High-power applications of ultrasound often use frequencies between 20 kHz and a few hundred kHz. Intensities can be very high; above 10 watts per square centimetre, cavitation can be inducted in liquid media, and some applications use up to 1000 watts per square centimetre. Such high intensities can induce chemical changes or produce significant effects by direct mechanical action, and can inactivate harmful microorganisms.

=== Physical therapy ===
Ultrasound has been used since the 1940s by physical and occupational therapists for treating connective tissue: ligaments, tendons, and fascia (and also scar tissue). Conditions for which ultrasound may be used for treatment include the follow examples: ligament sprains, muscle strains, tendonitis, joint inflammation, plantar fasciitis, metatarsalgia, facet irritation, impingement syndrome, bursitis, rheumatoid arthritis, osteoarthritis, and scar tissue adhesion.

Relatively high power ultrasound can break up stony deposits or tissue, increase skin permeability, accelerate the effect of drugs in a targeted area, assist in the measurement of the elastic properties of tissue, and can be used to sort cells or small particles for research.

=== Ultrasonic impact treatment ===
Ultrasonic impact treatment (UIT) uses ultrasound to enhance the mechanical and physical properties of metals. It is a metallurgical processing technique in which ultrasonic energy is applied to a metal object. Ultrasonic treatment can result in controlled residual compressive stress, grain refinement and grain size reduction. Low and high cycle fatigue are enhanced and have been documented to provide increases up to ten times greater than non-UIT specimens. Additionally, UIT has proven effective in addressing stress corrosion cracking, corrosion fatigue and related issues.

When the UIT tool, made up of the ultrasonic transducer, pins and other components, comes into contact with the work piece it acoustically couples with the work piece, creating harmonic resonance. This harmonic resonance is performed at a carefully calibrated frequency, to which metals respond very favourably.

Depending on the desired effects of treatment a combination of different frequencies and displacement amplitude is applied. These frequencies range between 25 and 55 kHz, with the displacement amplitude of the resonant body of between 22 and 50 μm (0.00087 and 0.0020 in).

UIT devices rely on magnetostrictive transducers.

=== Processing ===
Ultrasonication offers great potential in the processing of liquids and slurries, by improving the mixing and chemical reactions in various applications and industries. Ultrasonication generates alternating low-pressure and high-pressure waves in liquids, leading to the formation and violent collapse of small vacuum bubbles. This phenomenon is termed cavitation and causes high speed impinging liquid jets and strong hydrodynamic shear-forces. These effects are used for the deagglomeration and milling of micrometre and nanometre-size materials as well as for the disintegration of cells or the mixing of reactants. In this aspect, ultrasonication is an alternative to high-speed mixers and agitator bead mills. Ultrasonic foils under the moving wire in a paper machine will use the shock waves from the imploding bubbles to distribute the cellulose fibres more uniformly in the produced paper web, which will make a stronger paper with more even surfaces. Furthermore, chemical reactions benefit from the free radicals created by the cavitation as well as from the energy input and the material transfer through boundary layers. For many processes, this sonochemical (see sonochemistry) effect leads to a substantial reduction in the reaction time, like in the transesterification of oil into biodiesel.

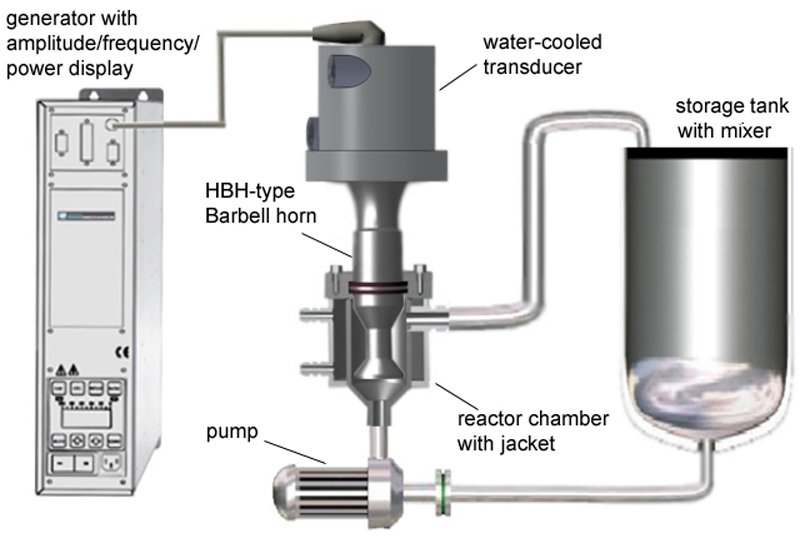
Schematic of bench and industrial-scale ultrasonic liquid processors

Substantial ultrasonic intensity and high ultrasonic vibration amplitudes are required for many processing applications, such as nano-crystallization, nano-emulsification, deagglomeration, extraction, cell disruption, as well as many others. Commonly, a process is first tested on a laboratory scale to prove feasibility and establish some of the required ultrasonic exposure parameters. After this phase is complete, the process is transferred to a pilot (bench) scale for flow-through pre-production optimization and then to an industrial scale for continuous production. During these scale-up steps, it is essential to make sure that all local exposure conditions (ultrasonic amplitude, cavitation intensity, time spent in the active cavitation zone, etc.) stay the same. If this condition is met, the quality of the final product remains at the optimized level, while the productivity is increased by a predictable "scale-up factor". The productivity increase results from the fact that laboratory, bench and industrial-scale ultrasonic processor systems incorporate progressively larger ultrasonic horns, able to generate progressively larger high-intensity cavitation zones and, therefore, to process more material per unit of time. This is called "direct scalability". It is important to point out that increasing the power of the ultrasonic processor alone does not result in direct scalability, since it may be (and frequently is) accompanied by a reduction in the ultrasonic amplitude and cavitation intensity. During direct scale-up, all processing conditions must be maintained, while the power rating of the equipment is increased in order to enable the operation of a larger ultrasonic horn.

=== Ultrasonic manipulation and characterization of particles ===
A researcher at the Industrial Materials Research Institute, Alessandro Malutta, devised an experiment that demonstrated the trapping action of ultrasonic standing waves on wood pulp fibres diluted in water and their parallel orienting into the equidistant pressure planes. The time to orient the fibres in equidistant planes is measured with a laser and an electro-optical sensor. This could provide the paper industry a quick on-line fibre size measurement system. A somewhat different implementation was demonstrated at Pennsylvania State University using a microchip which generated a pair of perpendicular standing surface acoustic waves allowing to position particles equidistant to each other on a grid. This experiment, called acoustic tweezers, can be used for applications in material sciences, biology, physics, chemistry and nanotechnology.

=== Ultrasonic cleaning ===
Ultrasonic cleaners, sometimes mistakenly called supersonic cleaners, are used at frequencies from 20 to 40 kHz for jewellery, lenses and other optical parts, watches, dental instruments, surgical instruments, diving regulators and industrial parts. An ultrasonic cleaner works mostly by energy released from the collapse of millions of microscopic cavitation bubbles near the dirty surface. The collapsing bubbles form tiny shockwaves that break up and disperse contaminants on the object's surface.

=== Ultrasonic disintegration ===
Similar to ultrasonic cleaning, biological cells including bacteria can be disintegrated. High power ultrasound produces cavitation that facilitates particle disintegration or reactions. This has uses in biological science for analytical or chemical purposes (sonication and sonoporation) and in killing bacteria in sewage. High power ultrasound can disintegrate corn slurry and enhance liquefaction and saccharification for higher ethanol yield in dry corn milling plants.

=== Ultrasonic humidification ===
Ultrasound waves can be used to create a very fine aerosol mist by vibrating a small metal plate at ultrasonic frequencies to nebulize (sometimes incorrectly called "atomize") the liquid. Because the water is not heated for evaporation, it produces a cool mist.

Ultrasonic humidification can be used in neonatal incubators, for nebulization of medications for respiratory treatment, for room humidification, and as ultrasonic hydroponic foggers used in aeroponics.

Ultrasonic pressure waves nebulize not only water but also materials in the water. This can be beneficial for delivering a uniform mist of medications to the airways during nebulization. However, calcium, other minerals, viruses, fungi, bacteria, and other impurities can also be present within the mist created, particularly in room humidifiers. Illness caused by impurities that reside in a humidifier's reservoir is called "Humidifier Fever".

=== Ultrasonic welding ===
In ultrasonic welding of plastics, high frequency (15 kHz to 40 kHz) low amplitude vibration is used to create heat by way of friction between the materials to be joined. The interface of the two parts is specially designed to concentrate the energy for maximum weld strength.

=== Sonochemistry ===
Power ultrasound in the 20–100 kHz range is used in chemistry. The ultrasound does not interact directly with molecules to induce the chemical change, as its typical wavelength (in the millimetre range) is too long compared to the molecules. Instead, the energy causes cavitation which generates extremes of temperature and pressure in the liquid where the reaction happens. Ultrasound also breaks up solids and removes passivating layers of inert material to give a larger surface area for the reaction to occur over. Both of these effects make the reaction faster. In 2008, Atul Kumar reported synthesis of Hantzsch esters and polyhydroquinoline derivatives via multi-component reaction protocol in aqueous micelles using ultrasound.

Ultrasound is used in extraction, using different frequencies.

== Other uses ==
When applied in specific configurations, ultrasound can produce short bursts of light in a phenomenon known as sonoluminescence.

Ultrasound is used when characterizing particulates through the technique of ultrasound attenuation spectroscopy or by observing electroacoustic phenomena or by transcranial pulsed ultrasound.

=== Wireless communication ===
Audio can be propagated by modulated ultrasound.

A formerly popular consumer application of ultrasound was in television remote controls for adjusting volume and changing channels. Introduced by Zenith in the late 1950s, the system used a hand-held remote control containing short rod resonators struck by small hammers, and a microphone on the set. Filters and detectors discriminated between the various operations. The principal advantages were that no battery was needed in the hand-held control box and, unlike radio waves, the ultrasound was unlikely to affect neighbouring sets. Ultrasound remained in use until displaced by infrared systems starting in the late 1980s.

In July 2015, The Economist reported that researchers at the University of California, Berkeley have conducted ultrasound studies using graphene diaphragms. The thinness and low weight of graphene combined with its strength make it an effective material to use in ultrasound communications. One suggested application of the technology would be underwater communications, where radio waves typically do not travel well.

Ultrasonic signals have been used in "audio beacons" for cross-device tracking of Internet users.

== Safety ==
Occupational exposure to ultrasound in excess of 120 dB may lead to hearing loss. Exposure in excess of 155 dB may produce heating effects that are harmful to the human body, and it has been calculated that exposures above 180 dB may lead to death. The UK's independent Advisory Group on Non-ionising Radiation (AGNIR) produced a report in 2010, which was published by the UK Health Protection Agency (HPA). This report recommended an exposure limit for the general public to airborne ultrasound sound pressure levels (SPL) of 70 dB (at 20 kHz), and 100 dB (at 25 kHz and above).

In medical ultrasound, guidelines exist to prevent inertial cavitation from happening. The risk of inertial cavitation damage is expressed by the mechanical index.

== See also ==
- Acoustic droplet ejection
- Acoustic emission
- Bat detector
- Contrast-enhanced ultrasound
- Delay-line memory
- Focused ultrasound-mediated diagnostics
- Infrasound — sound at extremely low frequencies
- Isochoic
- Laser ultrasonics
- Phased array ultrasonics
- Picosecond ultrasonics
- Sonomicrometry
- Sound from ultrasound (also known as hypersonic sound)
- Surface acoustic wave
- Ultrasonic motor
- Ultrasonic attenuation
- Ultrasound attenuation spectroscopy
