= Ultrasound attenuation spectroscopy =

Ultrasound attenuation spectroscopy is a method for characterizing properties of fluids and dispersed particles. It is also known as acoustic spectroscopy.

There is an international standard for this method. Measurement of attenuation coefficient versus ultrasound frequency yields raw data for further calculation of various system properties. Such raw data are often used in the calculation of the particle size distribution in heterogeneous systems such as emulsions and colloids. In the case of acoustic rheometers, the raw data are converted into extensional viscosity or volume viscosity.

Instruments that employ ultrasound attenuation spectroscopy are referred to as Acoustic spectrometers.
