= Acoustic rheometer =

Device that measures rheological properties

An acoustic rheometer is a device used to measure the rheological properties of fluids, such as viscosity and elasticity, by utilizing sound waves. It works by generating acoustic waves in the fluid and analyzing the changes in the wave propagation caused by the fluid's rheological behavior. An acoustic rheometer uses a piezo-electric crystal to generate the acoustic waves, applying an oscillating extensional stress to the system. System response can be interpreted in terms of extensional rheology.

This interpretation is based on a link between shear rheology, extensional rheology and acoustics. Relationship between these scientific disciplines was described in details by Litovitz and Davis in 1964.

It is well known that properties of viscoelastic fluid are characterised in shear rheology with a shear modulus G, which links shear stress T_{ij} and shear strain S_{ij}

$${T_{ij} = G \cdot S _{ij}}$$

There is similar linear relationship in extensional rheology between extensional stress P, extensional strain S and extensional modulus K:

$${P = - K \cdot S}$$

Detail theoretical analysis indicates that propagation of sound or ultrasound through a viscoelastic fluid depends on both shear modulus G and extensional modulus K. It is convenient to introduce a combined longitudinal modulus M:

$$M =M' + M''=K + \frac{4}{3}G$$

There are simple equations that express longitudinal modulus in terms of acoustic properties, sound speed V and attenuation α

$$M'= \rho \cdot V^2$$

$$M''= \frac{2 \rho \alpha V^3}{\omega}$$

Acoustic rheometer measures sound speed and attenuation of ultrasound for a set of frequencies in the megahertz range. These measurable parameters can be converted into real and imaginary components of longitudinal modulus.

Sound speed determines M', which is a measure of system elasticity. It can be converted into fluid compressibility.
Attenuation determines M", which is a measure of viscous properties, energy dissipation. This parameter can be considered as extensional viscosity
In the case of Newtonian liquid attenuation yields information on the volume viscosity. Stokes' law (sound attenuation) provides relationship among attenuation, dynamic viscosity and volume viscosity of the Newtonian fluid.

This type of rheometer works at much higher frequencies than others. It is suitable for studying effects with much shorter relaxation times than any other rheometer.

== See also ==
- Rheology
