= Extensional viscosity =

Polymer solution parameter

Extensional viscosity (also known as elongational viscosity) is a viscosity coefficient when the applied stress is extensional stress. It is often used for characterizing polymer solutions. Extensional viscosity can be measured using rheometers that apply extensional stress. Acoustic rheometer is one example of such devices.

Extensional viscosity is defined as the ratio of the normal stress difference to the rate of strain. For uniaxial extension along direction $z$:

$$\eta_e = \frac{\sigma_{zz} - \frac{1}{2}\sigma_{xx} - \frac{1}{2}\sigma_{yy}}{\dot{\varepsilon}}\,\!$$

where

$\eta_e\,\!$ is the extensional viscosity or elongational viscosity
$\sigma_{nn}\,\!$ is the normal stress along direction n.
$\dot{\varepsilon}\,\!$ is the rate of strain: $\dot{\varepsilon} = \frac{\partial v_z}{\partial z}\,\!$

The ratio between the extensional viscosity $\eta_e$ and the dynamic viscosity $\eta$ is known as Trouton's Ratio, $\mathrm{Tr} = \eta_e/\eta$. For a Newtonian Fluid, the Trouton ratio equals three.

== See also ==
- Rheology
