= Volume viscosity =

Material property relevant for characterizing fluid flow

Volume viscosity (also called bulk viscosity, or second viscosity or, dilatational viscosity) is a material property relevant for characterizing fluid flow. Common symbols are $\zeta, \mu', \mu_\mathrm{b}, \kappa$ or $\xi$. It has dimensions (mass / (length × time)), and the corresponding SI unit is the pascal-second (Pa·s).

Like other material properties (e.g. density, shear viscosity, and thermal conductivity) the value of volume viscosity is specific to each fluid and depends additionally on the fluid state, particularly its temperature and pressure. Physically, volume viscosity represents the irreversible resistance, over and above the reversible resistance caused by isentropic bulk modulus, to a compression or expansion of a fluid. At the molecular level, it stems from the finite time required for energy injected in the system to be distributed among the rotational and vibrational degrees of freedom of molecular motion.

Knowledge of the volume viscosity is important for understanding a variety of fluid phenomena, including sound attenuation in polyatomic gases (e.g. Stokes's law), propagation of shock waves, and dynamics of liquids containing gas bubbles. In many fluid dynamics problems, however, its effect can be neglected. For instance, it is 0 in a monatomic gas at low density (unless the gas is moderately relativistic), whereas in an incompressible flow the volume viscosity is superfluous since it does not appear in the equation of motion.

Volume viscosity was introduced in 1879 by Sir Horace Lamb in his famous work Hydrodynamics. Although relatively obscure in the scientific literature at large, volume viscosity is discussed in depth in many important works on fluid mechanics, fluid acoustics, theory of liquids, rheology, and relativistic hydrodynamics.

== Derivation and use ==
At thermodynamic equilibrium, the negative-one-third of the trace of the Cauchy stress tensor is often identified with the thermodynamic pressure,

$$-{1\over3}\sigma_a^a = P,$$

which depends only on equilibrium state variables like temperature and density (equation of state). In general, the trace of the stress tensor is the sum of thermodynamic pressure contribution and another contribution which is proportional to the divergence of the velocity field. This coefficient of proportionality is called volume viscosity. Common symbols for volume viscosity are $\zeta$ and $\mu_{v}$.

Volume viscosity appears in the classic Navier-Stokes equation if it is written for compressible fluid, as described in most books on general hydrodynamics and acoustics.

$$\rho \frac{D \mathbf{v}}{Dt} = -\nabla P +  \nabla\cdot\left[\mu\left(\nabla\mathbf{v} +  \left(\nabla\mathbf{v}\right)^T - \frac{2}{3} (\nabla\cdot\mathbf{v})\mathbf{I}\right) \right] + \nabla\cdot[\zeta(\nabla\cdot \mathbf{v})\mathbf{I}] + \rho \mathbf{g}$$

where $\mu$ is the shear viscosity coefficient and $\zeta$ is the volume viscosity coefficient. The parameters $\mu$ and $\zeta$ were originally called the first and bulk viscosity coefficients, respectively. The operator $D\mathbf{v}/Dt$ is the material derivative. By introducing the tensors (matrices) $\boldsymbol{\epsilon}$, $\boldsymbol{\gamma}$ and $e \mathbf{I}$ (where e is a scalar called dilation, and $\mathbf{I}$ is the identity tensor), which describes crude shear flow (i.e. the strain rate tensor), pure shear flow (i.e. the deviatoric part of the strain rate tensor, i.e. the shear rate tensor) and compression flow (i.e. the isotropic dilation tensor), respectively,

$$\boldsymbol{\epsilon} = \frac{1}{2}  \left( \nabla\mathbf{v} + \left(\nabla\mathbf{v}\right)^T \right)$$

$$e = \frac{1}{3} \nabla \! \cdot \! \mathbf{v}$$

$$\boldsymbol{\gamma} = \boldsymbol{\epsilon} - e \mathbf{I}$$

the classic Navier-Stokes equation gets a lucid form.

$$\rho \frac{D \mathbf{v}}{Dt} = -\nabla (P - 3 \zeta e) +  \nabla\cdot ( 2\mu \boldsymbol \gamma) + \rho \mathbf{g}$$

Note that the term in the momentum equation that contains the volume viscosity disappears for an incompressible flow because there is no divergence of the flow, and so also no flow dilation e to which is proportional:

$$\nabla \! \cdot \! \mathbf{v} =0$$

So the incompressible Navier-Stokes equation can be simply written:

$$\rho \frac{D \mathbf{v}}{Dt} = -\nabla P +  \nabla\cdot ( 2\mu \boldsymbol \epsilon) + \rho \mathbf{g}$$

In fact, note that for the incompressible flow the strain rate is purely deviatoric since there is no dilation (e=0). In other words, for an incompressible flow the isotropic stress component is simply the pressure:

$$p= \frac 1 3 Tr(\boldsymbol \sigma)$$

and the deviatoric (shear) stress is simply twice the product between the shear viscosity and the strain rate (Newton's constitutive law):

$$\boldsymbol \tau = 2 \mu \boldsymbol \epsilon$$

Therefore, in the incompressible flow the volume viscosity plays no role in the fluid dynamics.

However, in a compressible flow there are cases where $\zeta\gg\mu$, which are explained below. In general, moreover, $\zeta$ is not just a property of the fluid in the classic thermodynamic sense, but also depends on the process, for example the compression/expansion rate. The same goes for shear viscosity. For a Newtonian fluid the shear viscosity is a pure fluid property, but for a non-Newtonian fluid it is not a pure fluid property due to its dependence on the velocity gradient. Neither shear nor volume viscosity are equilibrium parameters or properties, but transport properties. The velocity gradient and/or compression rate are therefore independent variables together with pressure, temperature, and other state variables.

== Landau's explanation ==
According to Landau,

In compression or expansion, as in any rapid change of state, the fluid ceases to be in thermodynamic equilibrium, and internal processes are set up in it which tend to restore this equilibrium. These processes are usually so rapid (i.e. their relaxation time is so short) that the restoration of equilibrium follows the change in volume almost immediately unless, of course, the rate of change of volume is very large.

He later adds:

It may happen, nevertheless, that the relaxation times of the processes of restoration of equilibrium are long, i.e. they take place comparatively slowly.

After an example, he concludes (with $\zeta$ used to represent volume viscosity):

Hence, if the relaxation time of these processes is long, a considerable dissipation of energy occurs when the fluid is compressed or expanded, and, since this dissipation must be determined by the second viscosity, we reach the conclusion that $\zeta$ is large.

== Measurement ==
A brief review of the techniques available for measuring the volume viscosity of liquids can be found in Dukhin & Goetz and Sharma (2019). One such method is by using an acoustic rheometer.

Below are values of the volume viscosity for several Newtonian liquids at 25 °C (reported in cP):

methanol - 0.8
ethanol - 1.4
propanol - 2.7
pentanol - 2.8
acetone - 1.4
toluene - 7.6
cyclohexanone - 7.0
hexane - 2.4

Recent studies have determined the volume viscosity for a variety of gases, including carbon dioxide, methane, and nitrous oxide. These were found to have volume viscosities which were hundreds to thousands of times larger than their shear viscosities. Fluids having large volume viscosities include those used as working fluids in power systems having non-fossil fuel heat sources, wind tunnel testing, and pharmaceutical processing.

== Modeling ==
There are many publications dedicated to numerical modeling of volume viscosity. A detailed review of these studies can be found in Sharma (2019) and Cramer. In the latter study, a number of common fluids were found to have bulk viscosities which were hundreds to thousands of times larger than their shear viscosities. For relativistic liquids and gases, bulk viscosity is conveniently modeled in terms of a mathematical duality with chemically reacting relativistic fluids.
