= Reynolds =

Reynolds may refer to:

== Places ==
=== Australia ===
- Hundred of Reynolds, a cadastral unit in South Australia
- Hundred of Reynolds (Northern Territory), a cadastral unit in the Northern Territory of Australia

=== United States ===
- Reynolds, Mendocino County, California, a former settlement
- Reynolds, Georgia, a town in Taylor County
- Reynolds, Illinois, a village in Mercer and Rock Island counties
- Reynolds, Indiana, a town in White County
- Reynolds, Dallas County, Missouri, an unincorporated community
- Reynolds, Reynolds County, Missouri, an unincorporated community
- Reynolds, Nebraska, a village in Jefferson County
- Reynolds, North Dakota, a city
- Reynolds Township, Lee County, Illinois, a town
- Reynolds Township, Michigan, a civil township of Montcalm County
- Reynolds Township, Minnesota, a town in Todd County
- Reynolds County, Missouri, a county in southeast Missouri

=== Outer space ===
- Reynolds (crater), impact crater on Mars

== Business ==
- Reynolds Brothers, a New Jersey clothing store chain
- Reynolds Consumer Products
- Reynolds Group Holdings
- Reynolds International Pen Company, a pen brand of Newell Rubbermaid
- Reynolds Technology
  - Reynolds 531 (bicycles)
- R.J. Reynolds Tobacco Company
- Reynolds Metals, a foods packaging company, acquired then sold by Alcoa, now a standalone company
  - Reynolds (cycling team) named after Reynolds International, a Reynolds Metals subsidiary
- The Reynolds and Reynolds Company

== Fluid dynamics ==
- Reynolds-averaged Navier–Stokes equations
- Reynolds decomposition
- Reynolds number
- Reynolds transport theorem

== Law ==
- Reynolds v. Sims, a 1964 U.S. Supreme Court case concerning State legislature electoral districts
- Reynolds v. United States, an 1878 U.S. Supreme Court case about polygamy and the use of religious duty as a defense to criminal prosecution
- United States v. Reynolds, a 1952 U.S. Supreme Court case concerning the State Secrets Privilege
- Reynolds v Times Newspapers Ltd, a UK legal case concerning qualified privilege for publication of defamatory statements in the public interest, which led to the 'Reynolds defence'

== People ==
- Reynolds (surname)
- Reynolds Price (1933–2011), American author

== Other uses ==
- Hubble–Reynolds law of galaxy surface brightness
- Reynolds syndrome, a rare autoimmune disease
- Reynold's News

== See also ==
- Justice Reynolds (disambiguation)
- Reynolds High School (disambiguation)
- Rennell (disambiguation)
- Reynald (disambiguation)
