= Duu Guusd Heritage Site/Conservancy =

Heritage site in British Columbia, Canada

- IUCN category II (national park)
- Location within British Columbia
- Location: Haida Gwaii, British Columbia, Canada
- Coordinates: 53°50′N 133°00′W
- Area: 227,712 ha (879.20 sq mi)
- Designation: Conservancy
- Established: March 23, 2008
- Governing body: BC Parks

Duu Guusd Heritage Site/Conservancy is a heritage site and conservancy located in the northwest corner of Graham Island in the Haida Gwaii archipelago of British Columbia, Canada. It was established on March 23, 2008 to protect the ecological integrity and cultural importance of the region. The conservancy is part of an archipelago-wide system of protected areas that includes Gwaii Haanas National Park Reserve and Haida Heritage Site, Gwaii Haanas National Marine Conservation Area Reserve and Haida Heritage Site, and 17 other provincially protected areas.

== Geography ==
The terrestrial component of the heritage site/conservancy covers 143,593 hectares from the western side of Naden Harbour to the Pacific Ocean, and from Langara Island at Dixon Entrance to the northern end of Rennell Sound. The marine/foreshore component of the heritage site/conservancy covers an area of 84,173 hectares. Vladimir J. Krajina Ecological Reserve, which protects most of Port Chanal, is completely surrounded by Duu Guusd Heritage Site/Conservancy.

== Geology ==
The park features extensive fossil beds dating to the Mesozoic era.

== Culture ==
The cultural heritage values in the heritage site/conservancy include opportunities for the ongoing continuance of Haida culture through traditional use of the area. Examples of traditional use within the park include tree bark harvesting, medicinal plant cultivation, fishing, hunting, and totem erection.

In addition, the heritage site/conservancy hosts 88 recorded archaeological sites that contain at least 491 known cultural artifacts, with likely hundreds more yet to be discovered.

== See also ==
- Naikoon Provincial Park
