= Hundred of Hawarden =

Territory Of Australia

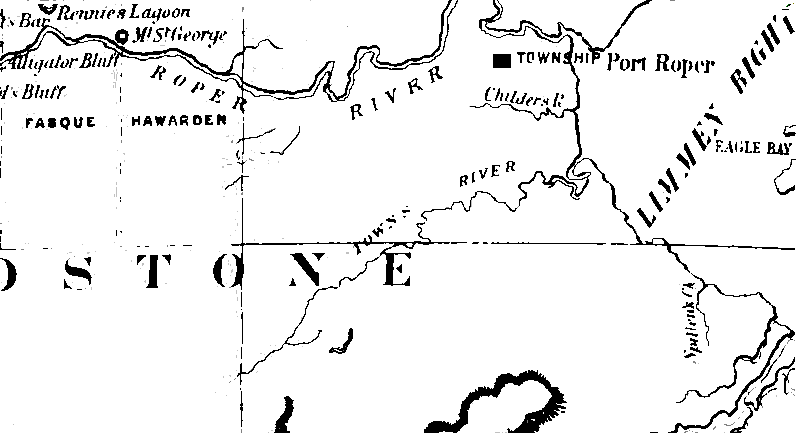
Map of Hawarden Hundred, in the Northern Territory based on the 1886 map by John Sands

Hundred of Hawarden was a Hundred of Gladstone County, Northern Territory of Australia.

== History ==
The first European to visit the Hundred was Ludwig Leichhardt who went through what would become the hundred as in 1845, and in 1855 Augustus Charles Gregory passed to the south of the Hundred on his route to Gladstone, Queensland. This Hundred was one of just 6 Hundreds in the County of Gladstone (located in the Roper River area) which was gazetted 09/01/1873. The Hundred lapsed with the passage in 1976 and subsequent assent of the Crown Lands Ordinance 1976 (No. 1 of 1977) and the Crown Lands (Validation of Proclamations) Ordinance 1976.

Today the Hundred is completely in the Limmen National Park, Limmen, Northern Territory, and the traditional owners of the area are the Yukul Australian Aboriginal people. The nearest settlement is Towns River.
