= Hundred of Glynne =

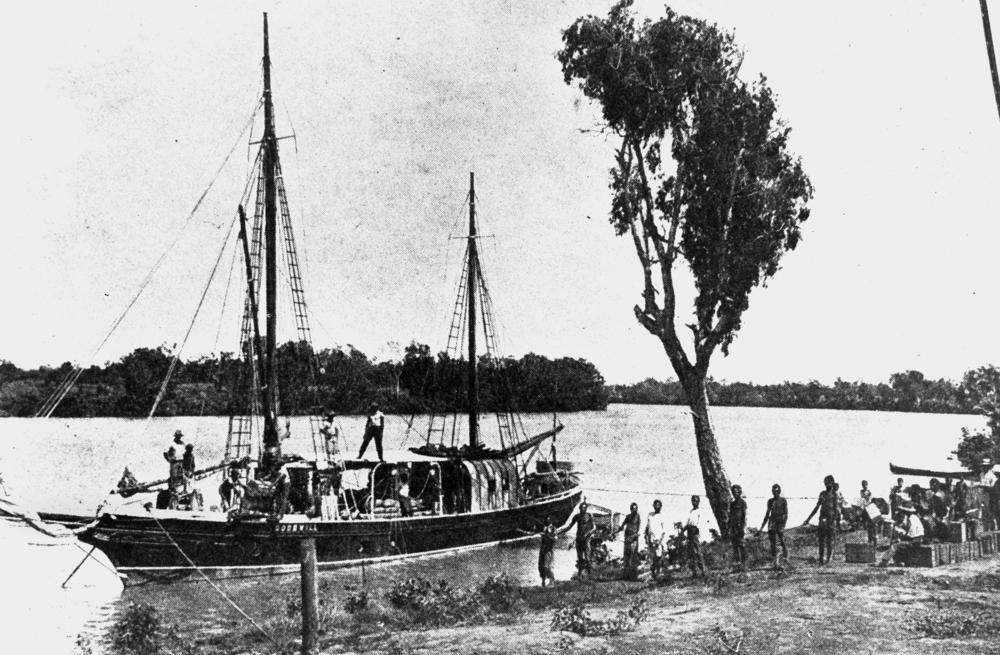
Goodwill (ship) at Ngukurr in 1917

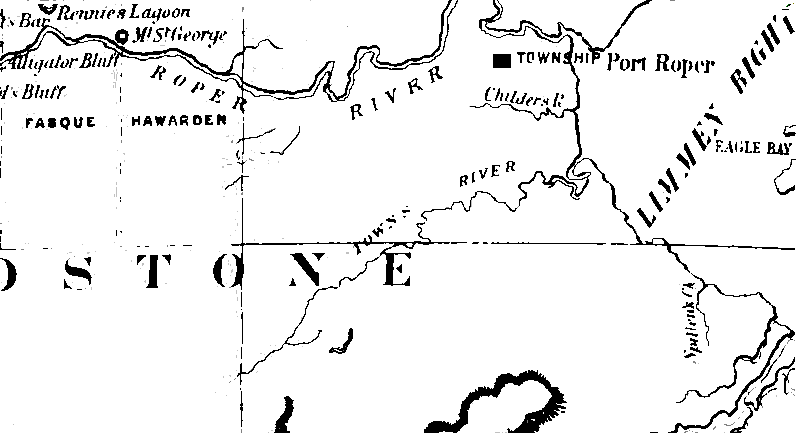
Map of the Roper River based on the 1886 map by John Sands.

The Hundred of Glynne was a Hundred of Gladstone County, Northern Territory Australia.

It is located 600 km southeast of Darwin, at Latitude: -14° 38' S and Longitude: 134° 48' E and It was named after the wife of British Prime Minister William Ewart Gladstone, Catherine Glynne.

The only town in the former Hundred is the small settlement of Ngukurr.

The first European to see the Hundred was Ludwig Leichhardt who crossed the Roper River at the Roper Bar in 1845, and in 1855 Augustus Charles Gregory passed to the south of the Hundred on his route to Gladstone, Queensland. This Hundred was one of just 6 Hundreds in the County of Gladstone (located in the Roper River area) which was gazetted 09/01/1873. Each of these hundreds was designed to be roughly 10 miles by 10 miles in area though some variation occurred due to the river course.

The Hundred lapsed with the passage in 1976 and subsequent assent of the Crown Lands Ordinace 1976 (No 1 of 1977) and the Crown Lands (Validation of Proclamations) Ordinance 1976. In 2012 the southern fringe of the hundred was incorporated into the Limmen National Park.
