= Favre averaging =

Favre averaging is the density-weighted averaging method, used in variable density or compressible turbulent flows, in place of the Reynolds averaging. The method was introduced formally by the French physicist Alexandre Favre in 1965, although Osborne Reynolds had also already introduced the density-weighted averaging in 1895. The averaging results in a simplistic form for the nonlinear convective terms of the Navier-Stokes equations, at the expense of making the diffusion terms complicated.

== Favre averaged variables ==
Favre averaging is carried out for all dynamical variables except the pressure. For the velocity components, $u_i$, the Favre averaging is defined as:

$\widetilde{u_i}= \frac{\overline{\rho u_i}}{\overline \rho},$

where the overbar indicates the typical Reynolds averaging, the tilde denotes the Favre averaging and $\rho(\mathbf{x},t)$ is the density field. The Favre decomposition of the velocity components is then written as:

$u_i =\widetilde{u_i} + u_i'',$

where $u_i''$ is the fluctuating part in the Favre averaging, which satisfies the condition $\widetilde{u_i''}=0$, that is to say, $\overline{\rho u_i''}=0$. The normal Reynolds decomposition is given by $u_i =\overline{u_i} + u_i'$, where $u_i'$ is the fluctuating part in the Reynolds averaging, which satisfies the condition $\overline{u_i'}=0$.

The Favre-averaged variables are more difficult to measure experimentally than the Reynolds-averaged ones, however, the two variables can be related in an exact manner if correlations between density and the fluctuating quantity is known; this is so because, we can write:

$\widetilde{u_i} = \overline{u_i} \left(1+ \frac{\overline{\rho'u_i'}}{\overline\rho\,\overline{u_i}}\right).$

The advantage of Favre-averaged variables are clearly seen by taking the normal averaging of the term $\rho u_iu_j$ that appears in the convective term of the Navier-Stokes equations written in its conserved form. This is given by

$$\begin{align}
\overline{\rho u_iu_j} &=\overline{\rho}\,\overline{u_i}\,\overline{u_j} + \overline\rho \overline{u_i'u_j'}+\overline{u_i}\overline{\rho'u_j'} + \overline{u_j}\overline{\rho'u_i'} + \overline{\rho'u_i'u_j'} \\
&= \overline\rho \widetilde{u_i}\widetilde{u_j} + \overline{\rho u_i''u_j''}.
\end{align}$$

As we can see, there are five terms in the averaging when expressed in terms of Reynolds-averaged variables, whereas we only have two terms when it is expressed in terms of Favre-averaged variables.
