= Hundred of Douglas =

- Cadastral division
- Coordinates: 14°44′06″S 134°31′44″E
- Country: Australia
- State: Northern Territory
- Location: 606 km (377 mi) from Darwin
- Established: 9 January 1873
- Abolished: 1977
- Time zone: UTC+9:30 (ACST)

The Hundred of Douglas was a hundred of Gladstone County in the Northern Territory of Australia.

It is located 606 km south of Darwin, at latitude 14° 38' S and longitude: 134° 30' E. It is on the Roper River in the bounded rural locality of Wilton, Northern Territory. The main towns of the Hundred are Urapunga and Roper Bar. The Hundred was designed to be roughly 10 miles by 10 miles in area.

== History ==
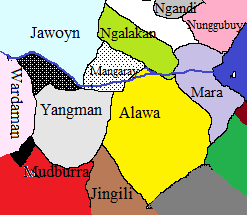
Traditional lands of the Aboriginal tribes in the Roper River area of the Northern Territory

The traditional owners of the hundred were the Ngalakgan Aboriginal people, one of the Gunwinyguan people who traditionally spoke the Ngalakgan language, although today many speak the Arnhem Kriol. Around 650 million years a ago the area was devastated by a powerful meteor strike at nearby Strangways River.

The first European to the Hundred was Ludwig Leichhardt who crossed the Roper River at the Roper Bar in 1845, and in 1855 Augustus Charles Gregory passed to the south of the Hundred on his route to Gladstone, Queensland.

This Hundred was one of six in the County of Gladstone (located in the Roper River area) which was gazetted in 1873. It was named after Captain Bloomfield Douglas, who visited the Roper River in 1872 as Government Resident of the Northern Territory.

Although today the area is predominantly covered by the Limmen National Park, the Roper River at the time of the foundation of the hundred was experiencing a rapid expansion of economic activity, and great prospects for the river valley were anticipated by the government in Adelaide. Pastoral leases were being taken up, gold had been discovered at Pine Creek to the north and in 1872 a store deport for the Australian Overland Telegraph Line was established at Roper Bar being the furthest point up river that was navigable to ships. The hundred was anticipated to be the seat of a prosperous port.

In the 1890s, the area was a favourite stopover for drovers bringing cattle between Queensland and the Kimberley region, and, according to The Sydney Morning Herald, it had a reputation as a "wild, outback outpost".

In 1902 Jeannie Gunn moved to nearby Elsey Station and wrote of her experience in the area, in the novel We of the Never Never.

The prosperous port, however, never eventuated and the Hundred lapsed with the passage in 1976 and subsequent assent of the Crown Lands Ordinace 1976 (No 1 of 1977) and the Crown Lands (Validation of Proclamations) Ordinance 1976 (No 2 of 1977).
