= Rennell =

Rennell may refer to:

== People ==
- Baron Rennell
  - Rennell Rodd, 1st Baron Rennell (1858–1941), British diplomat, poet and politician
  - Francis Rodd, 2nd Baron Rennell (1895–1978), British army officer and diplomat
  - Tremayne Rodd, 3rd Baron Rennell (1935–2006), Scottish rugby union player
- James Rennell (1742–1830), British geographer and pioneer oceanographer
- Paul Rennell, New Zealand soccer player
- Thomas Rennell (1754–1840), British clergyman
- Thomas Rennell (scholar) (1787–1824), British theologian and author

== Places ==
- Rennell Island, Solomon Islands
  - Rennell and Bellona Province
- Rennell Glacier, Antarctica
- Rennell Sound, Canada
- North Rennell Island, Chile
- South Rennell Island, Chile

== Animals ==
- Rennell fantail
- Rennell flying fox
- Rennell shrikebill
- Rennell starling
- Rennell Island monitor

== See also ==
- Renald
- Reynolds (disambiguation)
