= Osborne Reynolds =

Anglo-Irish innovator (1842–1912)

Osborne Reynolds FRS
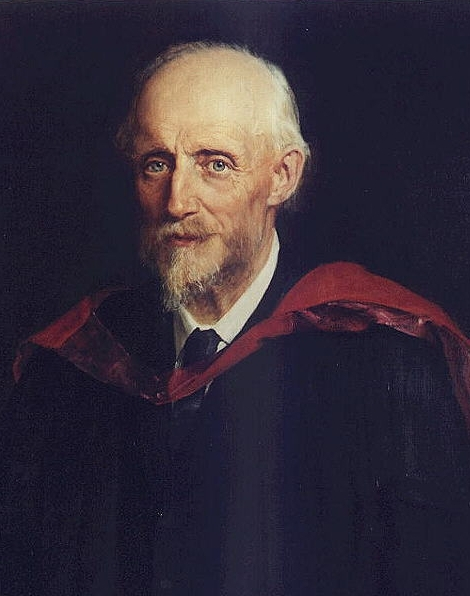
- Osborne Reynolds in 1903
- Born: 23 October 1842; Belfast, Ireland
- Died: 21 February 1912 (aged 69); Watchet, Somerset, England
- Education: Queens' College, Cambridge; Victoria University of Manchester
- Known for: Reynolds number Reynolds-averaged Navier-Stokes equations Reynolds stresses No-slip condition
- Awards: Royal Medal (1888); Dalton Medal (1903)
- Scientific career
- Fields: Physics, Mechanical Engineering

Osborne Reynolds (23 August 1842 – 21 February 1912) was an Irish-born British innovator in the understanding of fluid dynamics. Separately, his studies of heat transfer between solids and fluids brought improvements in boiler and condenser design. He spent his entire career at what is now the University of Manchester.

== Life ==
Osborne Reynolds was born in Belfast and moved with his parents soon afterward to Dedham, Essex. His father, Reverend Osborne Reynolds, was a Fellow of Queens' College, Cambridge who worked as a school headmaster and clergyman, but was also a very able mathematician with a keen interest in mechanics. The father took out a number of patents for improvements to agricultural equipment, and the son credits him with being his chief teacher as a boy. Reynolds showed an early aptitude and liking for the study of mechanics. In his late teens, for the year before entering university, he went to work as an apprentice at the workshop of Edward Hayes, a well known shipbuilder in Stony Stratford, where he obtained practical experience in the manufacture and fitting out of coastal steamers (and thus gained an early appreciation of the practical value of understanding fluid dynamics).

Osborne Reynolds attended Queens' College, Cambridge and graduated in 1867 as the seventh wrangler in mathematics. He had chosen to study mathematics at Cambridge because, in his own words in his 1868 application for the professorship, "From my earliest recollection I have had an irresistible liking for mechanics and the physical laws on which mechanics as a science is based.... my attention drawn to various mechanical phenomena, for the explanation of which I discovered that a knowledge of mathematics was essential." For the year immediately following his graduation from Cambridge he again took up a post with a civil engineering firm, Lawson and Mansergh of London, as a practising civil engineer working with the London (Croydon) sewage transport system.

In 1868 he was appointed to the newly instituted Chair of Civil and Mechanical Engineering at Owens College in Manchester (now the University of Manchester), becoming in that year one of the first professors in UK university history to hold the title of "Professor of Engineering". This professorship had been newly created and financed by a group of manufacturing industrialists in the Manchester area, and they also had a leading role in selecting the 25–year–old Reynolds to fill the position. Reynolds remained at Owens College for the rest of his career – in 1880 the college became a constituent college of the newly founded Victoria University. Reynolds was elected to membership of the Manchester Literary and Philosophical Society on 16 November 1869 and as a Fellow of the Royal Society in 1877. He was awarded the Royal Medal in 1888 and in 1903, the Dalton Medal of the Manchester Literary and Philosophical Society.

Regarding his family life, Osborne Reynolds married Charlotte Jemima in 1868. She died in 1869 after giving birth to their first-born child, also named Osborne. Their son died of an illness in 1879. Osborne Reynolds married Annie Charlotte on 29 December 1881, with whom he had three sons and a daughter.

He retired in 1905 and died of influenza 21 February 1912 at Watchet in Somerset. He was buried at the Church of St Decuman, Watchet.

== Fluid mechanics ==
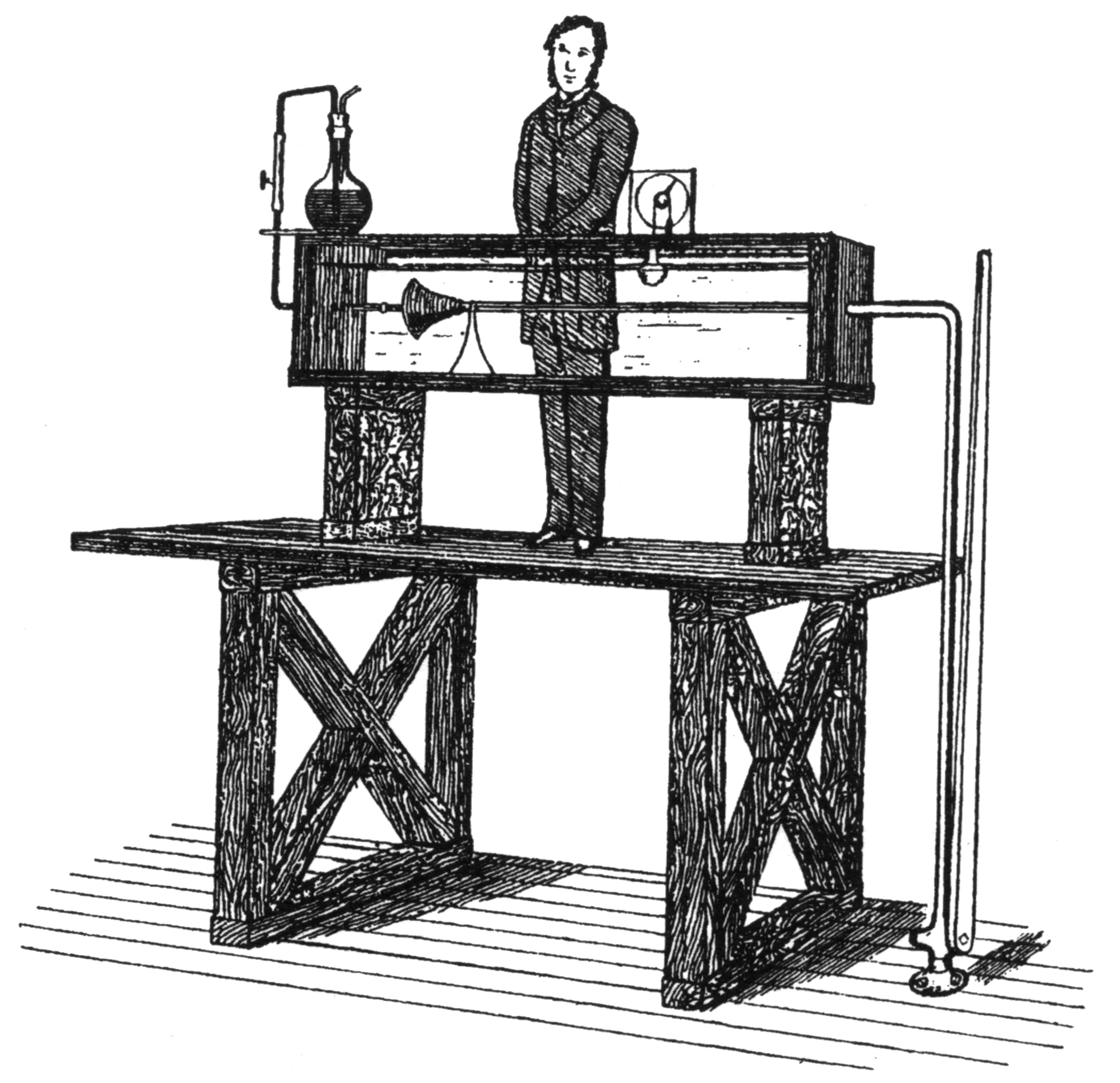
Reynolds' experiment on fluid dynamics in pipes

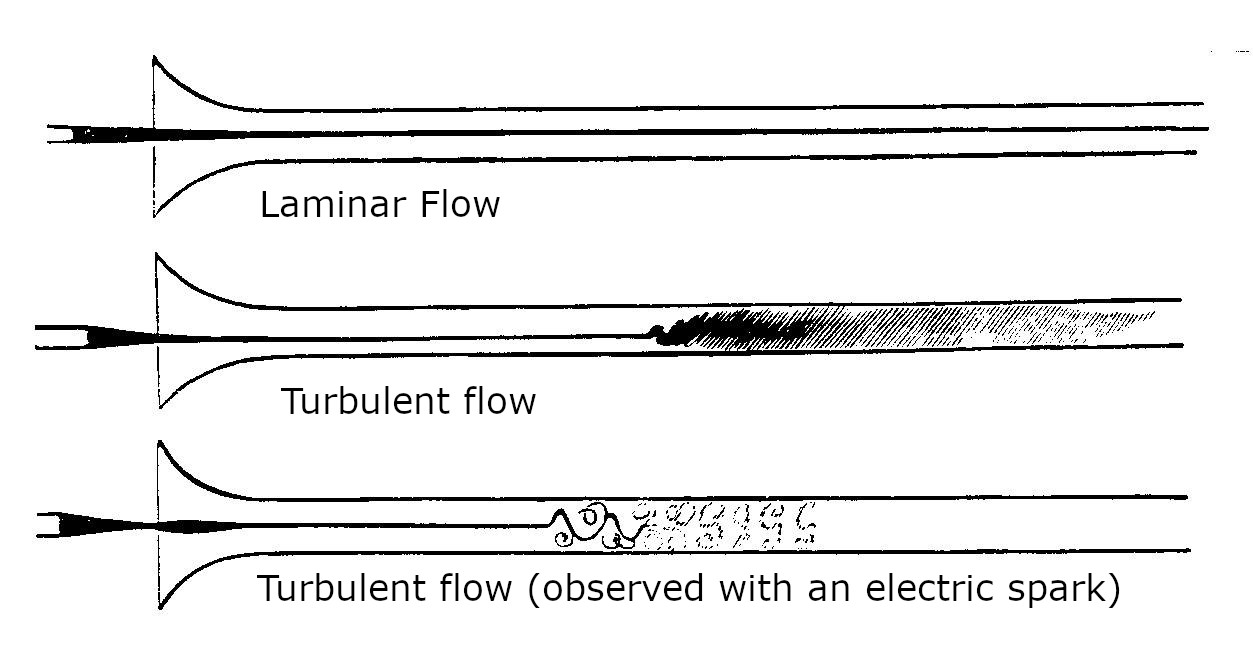
Reynolds' observations of the nature of the flow in his experiments

Reynolds most famously studied the conditions in which the flow of fluid in pipes transitioned from laminar flow to turbulent flow. In 1883 Reynolds demonstrated the transition to turbulent flow in a classic experiment in which he examined the behaviour of water flow under different flow rates using a small jet of dyed water introduced into the centre of flow in a larger pipe.

The larger pipe was glass so the behaviour of the layer of dyed flow could be observed, and at the end of this pipe there was a flow control valve used to vary the water velocity inside the tube. When the velocity was low, the dyed layer remained distinct through the entire length of the large tube. When the velocity was increased, the layer broke up at a given point and diffused throughout the fluid's cross-section. The point at which this happened was the transition point from laminar to turbulent flow.

From these experiments came the dimensionless Reynolds number for dynamic similarity—the ratio of inertial forces to viscous forces. Reynolds also proposed what is now known as Reynolds-averaging of turbulent flows, where quantities such as velocity are expressed as the sum of mean and fluctuating components. Such averaging allows for 'bulk' description of turbulent flow, for example using the Reynolds-averaged Navier–Stokes equations.

Reynolds' contributions to fluid mechanics were not lost on ship designers ("naval architects"). The ability to make a small scale model of a ship, and extract useful predictive data with respect to a full size ship, depends directly on the experimentalist applying Reynolds' turbulence principles to friction drag computations, along with a proper application of William Froude's theories of gravity wave energy and propagation. Reynolds himself had a number of papers concerning ship design published in Transactions of the Institution of Naval Architects.

== Publications ==
His publications in fluid dynamics began in the early 1870s. His final theoretical model published in the mid-1890s is still the standard mathematical framework used today. Examples of titles from his more groundbreaking reports:

- "An experimental investigation of the circumstances which determine whether the motion of water shall be direct or sinuous, and of the law of resistance in parallel channels". Proceedings of the Royal Society of London. 35 (224–226): 84–99. 1883. Bibcode:1883RSPS...35...84R. doi:10.1098/rspl.1883.0018.
- "On the dynamical theory of incompressible viscous fluids and the determination of the criterion" (PDF). Proceedings of the Royal Society of London. 56 (336–339): 40–45. 1894.
- Papers on mechanical and physical subjects. Vol. 1. Cambridge. 1900.
- Papers on mechanical and physical subjects. Vol. 2. Cambridge. 1901.
- Papers on mechanical and physical subjects. Vol. 3. Cambridge. 1903.
- The Sub-Mechanics of the Universe (PDF). Cambridge. 1903.
- "On the dilatancy of media composed of rigid particles in contact. With experimental illustrations". Philosophical Magazine. Series 5. 20 (127): 469–481. 1885. doi:10.1080/14786448508627791. ISSN 1941-5982. Zenodo: 1431173.
- "On Certain Dimensional Properties of Matter in the Gaseous State. Part I. Experimental Researches on Thermal Transpiration of Gases through Porous Plates and on the Laws of Transpiration and Impulsion, Including an Experimental Proof That Gas is Not a Continuous Plenum. Part II. On an Extension of the Dynamical Theory of Gas, Which Includes the Stresses, Tangential and Normal, Caused by a Varying Condition of Gas, and Affords an Explanation of the Phenomena of Transpiration and Impulsion". Philosophical Transactions of the Royal Society of London. 170: 727–845. 1879. doi:10.1098/rstl.1879.0078. ISSN 0261-0523.
- Memoir of James Prescott Joule. Cambridge University Press. 2011 [1892]. ISBN 978-1-108-02880-6.

== Other work ==
Reynolds published about seventy science and engineering research reports. When towards the end of his career these were republished as a collection they filled three volumes. For a catalogue and short summaries of them see the External links. Areas covered besides fluid dynamics included thermodynamics, kinetic theory of gases, condensation of steam, screw-propeller-type ship propulsion, turbine-type ship propulsion, hydraulic brakes, hydrodynamic lubrication, and laboratory apparatus for better measurement of Joule's mechanical equivalent of heat. For his work on lubrication, he was named by Duncan Dowson as one of the 23 "Men of Tribology".

One of the subjects that Reynolds studied in the 1880s was the properties of granular materials, including dilatant materials. In 1903 appeared his 250-page book The Sub-Mechanics of the Universe, in which he tried to generalise the mechanics of granular materials to be "capable of accounting for all the physical evidence, as we know it, in the Universe". His aim seems to have been to construct a theory of aether, which he considered to be in a liquid state. The ideas were extremely difficult to understand or evaluate, and in any case were overtaken by other developments in physics around the same time.

To honour Prof Reynolds' life and achievements, the University of Manchester has been running an annual event focused on latest developments in fluid mechanics and turbulence since 2001.

== See also ==
- Reynolds number
- Reynolds analogy
- Reynolds equation
- Reynolds transport theorem
- Reynolds decomposition
- Reynolds stress
- Reynolds-averaged Navier–Stokes equations
- Reynolds' dilatancy
- Reynolds operator

Professional and academic associations
Preceded by Balfour Stewart	President of the Manchester Literary and Philosophical Society; 1888–90	Succeeded by Henry Edward Schunck
Preceded by Joseph Baxendell	Secretary of the Manchester Literary and Philosophical Society; 1874–84	Succeeded by James Thomson Bottomley
