= Reynolds operator =

In fluid dynamics and invariant theory, a Reynolds operator is a mathematical operator given by averaging something over a group action, satisfying a set of properties called Reynolds rules. In fluid dynamics, Reynolds operators are often encountered in models of turbulent flows, particularly the Reynolds-averaged Navier–Stokes equations, where the average is typically taken over the fluid flow under the group of time translations. In invariant theory, the average is often taken over a compact group or reductive algebraic group acting on a commutative algebra, such as a ring of polynomials. Reynolds operators were introduced into fluid dynamics by Osbourne Reynolds (1895) and named by J. Kampé de Fériet (1934, 1935, 1949).

== Definition ==
Reynolds operators are used in fluid dynamics, functional analysis, and invariant theory, and the notation and definitions in these areas differ slightly. A Reynolds operator acting on $\phi$ is sometimes denoted by $R(\phi),P(\phi),\rho(\phi),\langle \phi \rangle$ or $\overline{\phi}$. Reynolds operators are usually linear operators acting on some algebra of functions, satisfying the identity

$$R(R(\phi)\psi) = R(\phi)R(\psi) \quad \text{ for all } \phi,\psi$$

and sometimes some other conditions, such as commuting with various group actions.

=== Invariant theory ===
In invariant theory a Reynolds operator R is usually a linear operator satisfying

$$R(R(\phi)\psi) = R(\phi)R(\psi) \quad \text{ for all } \phi,\psi$$

and

$$R(1) = 1$$

Together these conditions imply that R is idempotent: R^{2} = R. The Reynolds operator will also usually commute with some group action, and project onto the invariant elements of this group action.

For a finite group G this looks like averaging over the representations $\rho(g)$ of each of the group elements:

$$R_G = \frac{1}{\vert G \vert} \sum_{g \in G} \rho(g)$$

=== Functional analysis ===
In functional analysis a Reynolds operator is a linear operator R acting on some algebra of functions φ, satisfying the Reynolds identity

$$R(\phi\psi) = R(\phi)R(\psi) + R\left(\left(\phi-R(\phi)\right)\left(\psi-R(\psi)\right) \right)\quad \text{ for all } \phi,\psi$$

The operator R is called an averaging operator if it is linear and satisfies

$$R(R(\phi)\psi) = R(\phi)R(\psi) \quad \text{ for all } \phi,\psi$$

If R(R(φ)) = R(φ) for all φ then R is an averaging operator if and only if it is a Reynolds operator. Sometimes the R(R(φ)) = R(φ) condition is added to the definition of Reynolds operators.

=== Fluid dynamics ===
Let $\phi$ and $\psi$ be two random variables, and $a$ be an arbitrary constant. Then the properties satisfied by Reynolds operators, for an operator $\langle \rangle,$ include linearity and the averaging property:

$$\langle \phi + \psi \rangle = \langle \phi \rangle + \langle \psi \rangle, \,$$

$$\langle a \phi \rangle = a \langle \phi \rangle, \,$$

$\langle \langle \phi \rangle \psi \rangle = \langle \phi \rangle \langle \psi \rangle, \,$ which implies $\langle \langle \phi \rangle \rangle = \langle \phi \rangle. \,$

In addition the Reynolds operator is often assumed to commute with space and time translations:

$$\left\langle \frac{ \partial \phi }{ \partial t } \right\rangle = \frac{ \partial \langle \phi \rangle }{ \partial t }, \qquad
\left\langle \frac{ \partial \phi }{ \partial x } \right\rangle = \frac{ \partial \langle \phi \rangle }{ \partial x },$$

$$\left\langle \int \phi( \boldsymbol{x}, t ) \, d \boldsymbol{x} \, dt \right\rangle = \int \langle \phi(\boldsymbol{x},t) \rangle \, d \boldsymbol{x} \, dt.$$

Any operator satisfying these properties is a Reynolds operator.

== Examples ==
Reynolds operators are often given by projecting onto an invariant subspace of a group action.

- The "Reynolds operator" considered by Reynolds (1895) was essentially the projection of a fluid flow to the "average" fluid flow, which can be thought of as projection to time-invariant flows. Here the group action is given by the action of the group of time-translations.
- Suppose that G is a reductive algebraic group or a compact group, and V is a finite-dimensional representation of G. Then G also acts on the symmetric algebra SV of polynomials. The Reynolds operator R is the G-invariant projection from SV to the subring SV^{G} of elements fixed by G.
