= County of Gladstone (Northern Territory) =

- Cadastral division
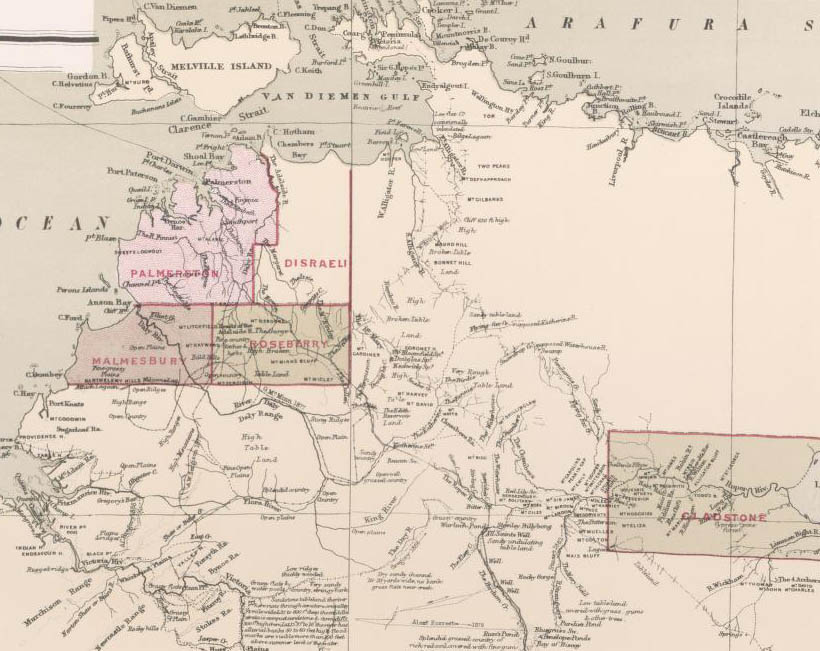
- 1886 map showing the small part of the Northern Territory subdivided into five counties

- Coordinates: 15°0′0″S 135°0′0″E
- Country: Australia
- State: Northern Territory
- Established: 9 January 1873
- Abolished: 1977

County of Gladstone was one of the five counties in the Northern Territory which are part of the cadastral divisions of Australia.

Gladstone County was one of the original three counties in the top end, and the only county not in the Darwin hinterland. The county was partly subdivided into hundreds.

The county was centred on the Roper River at a time when the Roper River seemed to offer a great economic possibility. The county covers the traditional lands of the Ngalakan, Marra, and Mangarayi peoples. Main settlements in the county included Urapunga, Mataranka and Jilkminggan and Ngukurr.

It ceased to exist in 1977 after changes caused by the passage and assent in 1976 of the following ordinances: the Crown Lands Ordinance 1976 (No 1 of 1977) and the Crown Lands (Validation of Proclamations) Ordinance 1976 (No 2 of 1977).

== Name ==
Like the other counties of the Northern Territory, Gladstone is named for a British prime minister; in this case the county was named after William Ewart Gladstone. Most of the hundreds in the county are named after people and places associated with Gladstone.

== Hundreds ==
The central part of the county was originally subdivided into hundreds, but these have largely become redundant.

- Hundred of Douglas
- Hundred of Reynolds
- Hundred of Fasque
- Hundred of Flint
- Hundred of Glynne
- Hundred of Hawarden
