= Reynolds High School =

Reynolds High School may refer to:

== United Kingdom ==
- Reynolds High School (Acton), now Ark Acton Academy, London Borough of Ealing, England

== United States ==
- A. C. Reynolds High School, Asheville, North Carolina
- Richard J. Reynolds High School, Winston-Salem, North Carolina
- Reynolds High School (Troutdale, Oregon)
- Reynolds Junior/Senior High School, in the Reynolds School District, Greenville, Pennsylvania
- Reynolds High School (Georgia) in Reynolds, Georgia consolidated in 1960s
