= Justice Reynolds =

Justice Reynolds may refer to:

- Charles H. Reynolds (1924–1996), associate justice of the Kentucky Supreme Court
- Frank B. Reynolds (1874–1922), associate justice of the Montana Supreme Court
- John Reynolds (Illinois politician) (1788–1865), associate justice of the Illinois Supreme Court
- Joseph Reynolds (Rhode Island) (1748–1818), associate justice of the Rhode Island Supreme Court
- Thomas Reynolds (governor) (1796–1844), chief justice of the Illinois Supreme Court
