= Hundred of Reynolds (Northern Territory) =

Hundred of Reynolds Northern Territory
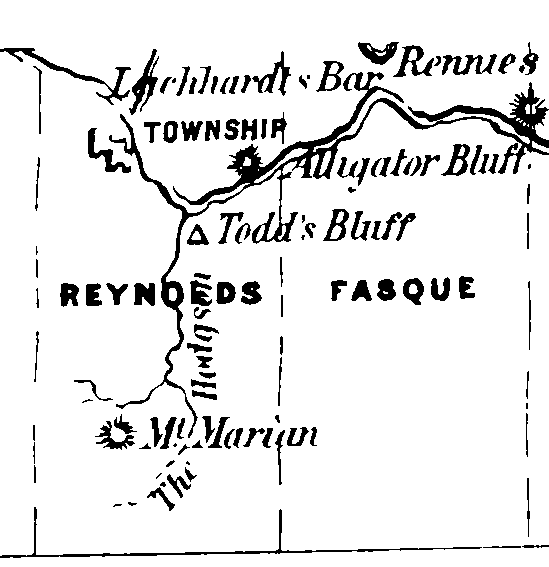
- Map of the Hundred of Reynolds, Northern Territory published by John Sands in 1886.

- Coordinates: 14°53′0″S 134°30′0″E
- Established: 9 January 1873
- Abolished: 1976

The Hundred of Reynolds was a hundred of the County of Gladstone in the Northern Territory of Australia which was created in 1873 and which lapsed in 1976. It is located 600 km south-east of the territorial capital of Darwin.

== History ==
The Hundred is on the treadtional lands of the Alawa and Mara people.

The first European to see the Hundred was Ludwig Leichhardt who crossed the Roper River at the Roper Bar in 1845, and in 1855 Augustus Charles Gregory passed to the south of the Hundred on his route to Gladstone, Queensland.

The Hundred was gazetted on 9 January 1873 along with six others in the County of Gladstone.

It was named after Thomas Reynolds, a former Premier of South Australia, who lived in the North Territory during the years 1873-74 and who died in the wrecking of the SS Gothenburg in February 1875.

The Hundred lapsed with the passage in 1976 and subsequent assent of the Crown Lands Ordinance 1976 (No 1 of 1977) and the Crown Lands (Validation of Proclamations) Ordinance 1976.

== See also ==
- Hundred of Reynolds in South Australia
