= Rennell Sound =

Coordinates: 53°24′00″N 132°44′00″W

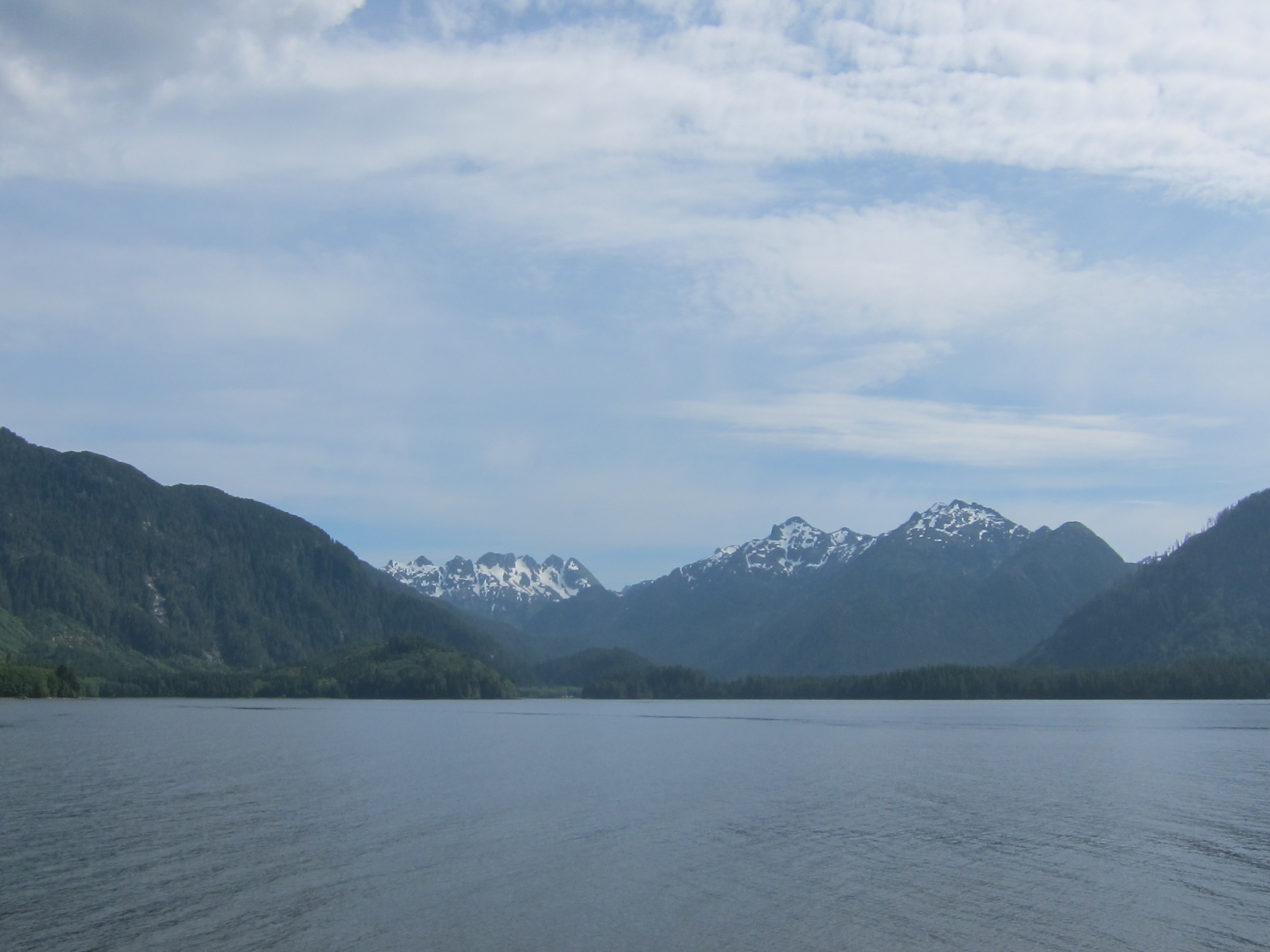
The Queen Charlotte Mountains and Rennell Sound

Rennell Sound is a sound off the west coast of Graham Island in Haida Gwaii, a coastal archipelago of the North Coast region of British Columbia, Canada.
