= Limmen National Park =

National park in Australia

Coordinates: 15°01′48″S 135°08′24″E

- IUCN category II (national park)
- Limmen National Park map

- Location within Northern Territory
- Location: Northern Territory
- Nearest city: Katherine
- Area: 9,369.26 km^{2} (3,617.49 sq mi)
- Established: 26 June 2012
- Governing body: Parks and Wildlife Commission of the Northern Territory
- Website: https://nt.gov.au/parks/find-a-park/limmen-national-park

Limmen National Park, announced in 2012, is the third largest national park in the Northern Territory, after Judbarra / Gregory National Park, with an area of approximately 9,369 square kilometres (3,617 sq mi). Located about 600 km south-east of Darwin on the Gulf of Carpentaria, the park incorporates wetlands, sandstone structures and numerous rivers, including the Limmen Bight River from which the park takes its name.

== Controversy and mining ==
Limmen National Park was declared in 2012 but approximately 20% of the area originally planned for the park was excluded to allow for Iron Ore exploration and extraction, a decision welcomed by Western Desert Resources, the company developing an Iron Ore mine in the excised region. However, the NT Environment Centre argued that the NT Government had been "unnecessarily generous to miners" and concerns were also raised by the Amateur Fishermen's Association of the Northern Territory and neighbouring pastoral lease holders, upset by Western Desert Resources building a haul road across their property.

Following a decline in the price of Iron Ore, Western Desert Resources went into administration in 2014 and their mining operations ceased. In 2018, the Northern Territory Government approved a new operator to restart the mine, this time operated by Nathan River Resources, a company owned by international shipping and mining company British Marine.

== Heritage and attractions ==
A major attraction in the park are the "Lost Cities"—sandstone rock formations resembling tall apartment blocks.

=== Rock art ===
Miniature rock art of the stencilled variety at a rock shelter known as Yilbilinji, in Limmen National Park, is one of only three known examples of such art. Usually stencilled art is life-size, using body parts as the stencil, but the 17 images of designs of human figures, boomerangs, animals such as crabs and long-necked turtles, wavy lines and geometric shapes are very rare. Found in 2017 by archaeologists, the only other recorded examples are at Nielson's Creek in New South Wales and at Kisar Island in Indonesia. It is thought that the designs may have been created by stencils fashioned out of beeswax.
