= Reynolds decomposition =

Mathematical method in fluid dynamics

In fluid dynamics and turbulence theory, a Reynolds decomposition is a mathematical technique used to separate a field into its mean and fluctuating components.

== Formulation ==
A Reynolds decomposition of a field $\mathbf{u}$ (e.g., a velocity field) is given by
$$\mathbf{u}(\mathbf{x},t) = \overline{\mathbf{u}(\mathbf{x},t)} + \mathbf{u}'(\mathbf{x},t),$$
where $\overline{\mathbf{u}}$ denotes the mean of $\mathbf{u}$ (which can be a time, space, or ensemble average), and $\mathbf{u}'$ denotes the fluctuations from that mean. The fluctuating field is defined as
$$\mathbf{u}'(\mathbf{x},t) \equiv  \mathbf{u}(\mathbf{x},t) - \overline{\mathbf{u}(\mathbf{x},t)}$$
and satisfies
$$\overline{\mathbf{u}'(\mathbf{x},t)} =0.$$
Note that the mean field $\overline{\mathbf{u}}$ is also frequently denoted as $\langle \mathbf{u}\rangle$.

== Application ==
Direct numerical simulation, or resolution of the Navier–Stokes equations (nearly) completely in both space and time, is only possible on extremely fine computational grids using small time steps even for low Reynolds numbers. Running direct numerical simulations often becomes prohibitively computationally expensive at high Reynolds' numbers. Due to computational constraints, simplifications of the Navier-Stokes equations are useful to parameterize turbulence that are smaller than the computational grid, allowing larger computational domains.

Reynolds decomposition allows the simplification of the Navier–Stokes equations by substituting in the sum of the steady component and perturbations to the velocity profile and taking the mean value, to obtain the Reynolds-averaged Navier–Stokes equations. The resulting equation contains a nonlinear term known as the Reynolds stresses, representing effects of turbulence.

== See also ==
- Reynolds-averaged Navier–Stokes equations
