= Index of engineering science and mechanics articles =

This is an alphabetical list of articles pertaining specifically to Engineering Science and Mechanics (ESM). For a broad overview of engineering, please see Engineering. For biographies please see List of engineers and Mechanicians.

== A ==
Acceleration – Accelerometer – Accuracy and precision – Adhesive bonds – Adhesives – Aerodynamics – Aeroelasticity – Aerospace engineering – Aircraft – American Association for the Advancement of Science – American Institute of Aeronautics and Astronautics – American Physical Society – Ampere – Applied mathematics – Applied mechanics – Archimedes' screw – Armor – Artificial intelligence – Atmospheric turbulence – Automobile – Axle –

== B ==
Beams – Bending – Biodynamic agriculture – Biomaterials – Biomechanical stability – Biomechanics – Biomechatronics – Biomedical engineering – Biomimetic – Brittle – Buckling –

== C ==
CAD – CAID – Calculator – Calculus – Car handling – Carbon fiber – Chaos theory – Civil engineering – Classical mechanics – Clean room design – Combustion – Complex systems – Composite material – Compression ratio – Compressive strength – Computational fluid dynamics – Computational mechanics – Computer – Computer-aided design – Conservation of mass – Constant-velocity joint – Constraint – Continuum mechanics – Control theory – Corrosion –

== D ==
Deformation – Delamination – Design – Deterministic – Differential equation – Dimensionless number – Direct numerical simulation – Durability – Dynamical system – Dynamics – Dynamic response –

== E ==
Earthquake engineering – Elasticity – Electric motor – Electrical engineering – Electrical circuit – Electrical network – Electromagnetism – Engineering – Engineering education – Engineering economics – Engineering ethics – Engineering fundamentals – Engineering physics – Engineering science – Engineering society – Experimental mechanics –

== F ==
Factor of safety – False precision – Fracture – Fatigue – Ferrofluid – Filter (large eddy simulation) – Finite element analysis – Fluid dynamics – Fluid structure interaction – Force – Force density – Friction – Functionally graded material – Fundamentals of Engineering exam – Fusion deposition modelling –

== G ==
Gasdynamics – Gear – Granular material –

== H ==
Higher-order statistical analysis – Hooke's law – Hydraulics – Hydrostatics – Hypersonic –

== I ==
Impact mechanics – Inclined plane – Inertia – Infrastructure health monitoring – Instrumentation – International Union of Theoretical and Applied Mechanics – Invention –

== J ==
Joule –

== K ==
Kelvin – Kinematics –

== L ==
Large eddy simulation – Laser – Lattice Boltzmann methods – Leadership – Lever – Life-cycle cost analysis – Lubrication –

== M ==
Machine – Mass transfer – Materials – Materials behavior – Materials engineering – Materials science – Mechanical efficiency – Mechanical equilibrium – Mechanical work – Mechanics – Mechanics of materials – MEMS – Microfluidics – Micromachinery – Micromechanics – Mineral engineering – Mining engineering – Molecular assembler – Molecular dynamics – Molecular mechanics – Molecular nanotechnology – Moment – Moment of inertia – Multi-link suspension – Multifunctional materials – Multiphysics problems – Multiscale analysis –

== N ==
Nanoscience – Nanotechnology – Nanoelectromechanical system (NEMS) – Neuromuscular control – Nondestructive evaluation – Nonlinear elasticity – Nonlinear dynamics – Nonlinear wave – Normal stress – Nozzle –

== O ==
Ocean engineering –

== P ==
Pascal – Penetration dynamics – Perturbation methods – Physics – Pinion – Piston – Plasticity – Pneumatics – Poisson's ratio – Position vector – Potential difference – Power – Pressure – Prime mover – Probabilistic mechanics – Probabilistic methods – Process control – Professional engineer – Project management – Pulley – Pump –

== Q ==
Quality – Quality control –

== R ==
Rack and pinion – Reacting flow – Rear wheel drive – Refrigeration – Reliability engineering – Reverse engineering – Rheology – Rigid body – Robotics – Rolling –

== S ==
Safety engineering – Self assembly – Semiconductor – Sensors – Series and parallel circuits – Shear strength – Shear stress – Shells – Shock waves – Simple machine – Simulation – Soft matter – Soft tissue – Solid mechanics – Solid modeling – Statics – Statistical analysis – Stochastic methods – Stress–strain curve – Structural failure – Structural vibration – Student design competition – Superfluid hydrodynamics – Supersonic – Suspension –

== T ==
Technology – Tensile strength – Tensile stress – Theoretical mechanics – Theory of elasticity – Thermodynamics – Thermomagnetic convection – Torque – Torsion spring – Toughness – Transport phenomena – Turbine – Tribology –

== U ==
Unsprung weight –

== V ==
Validation – Valve – Vector – Vertical strength – Vibration – Viscosity – Viscoelasticity – Volt – Vortex dynamics –

== W ==
Wave mechanics – Wave propagation – Water waves – Wear – Work (physics) –

== Y ==
Yield strength – Young's modulus –

== Z ==
Zero Defects –
