= Ceramic filter =

Ceramic filter may refer to:

== Separation ==
- Ceramic water filter
- Vacuum ceramic filter, used to separate liquids from solids
- Diesel particulate filter

== Electronics ==
- Ceramic filter (electronics), device used in IF and RF bandpass filter applications
- SAW filter, a ceramic filter using a surface acoustic wave, rather than bulk material effects
- Thin-film bulk acoustic resonator, device used for high-frequency signal filtering

== See also ==
- Filter (disambiguation)
