= Dara Moazzami =

- دارا معظمی
- Born: 10 December 1949 (age 76); Tehran, Iran
- Education: Alborz High School, University of Quebec-Montreal in Canada, University of Northeastern, Boston, Massachusetts, University of Tehran, College of Engineering, Faculty of Engineering Science, Golpayegan University of Technology
- Known for: Applied mathematics, graph Theory, discrete mathematics, advanced algorithms, approximation algorithms, network vulnerability, tenacity parameter
- Scientific career
- Workplaces: Faculty of Engineering Science, College of Engineering, University of Tehran; President of Golpayegan University of Technology, Kennesaw State University

Dara Moazzami (born 10 December 1949) is an Iranian engineering scientist.

== Early life ==
Moazzami earned a BSc in Pure Mathematics in 1976 and an MSc in Applied Mathematics in 1978 from the University of Quebec-Montreal in Canada.

== Career ==
After completing his studies at the University of Quebec-Montreal, Moazzami returned to Iran and worked at Bu-Ali Sina University in Hamedan. In 1992, he received his Ph.D. in applied mathematics from the University of Northeastern-Boston MA, under the supervision of Professors Margaret Cozzens and Samuel Keith Stueckle.

Moazzami is credited with introducing the concept of graph tenacity, which measures network vulnerability and reliability, alongside his professors Cozzens and Stueckle.
