= Taylor–Green vortex =

Periodic vortex array in fluid dynamics

Vorticity, streamlines, and fluid particle trajectories from a simulation of a decaying two-dimensional Taylor–Green vortex at Reynolds number Re = 100

In fluid dynamics, the Taylor–Green vortex is a spatially periodic array of counter-rotating vortices, named after the British physicist and mathematician G. I. Taylor and his collaborator Albert E. Green. In two dimensions the array decays under viscosity without changing shape, and the decaying flow is an exact closed-form solution of the incompressible Navier–Stokes equations. Taylor published it in 1923, and it is commonly used to test numerical methods. The three-dimensional version was introduced by Taylor and Green in 1937 to study how large eddies produce smaller ones. Its shape changes as vortex stretching generates small-scale structure, and at sufficiently high Reynolds numbers the flow becomes turbulent. It has become a standard benchmark for simulations of transition to turbulence.

== History ==
In 1923 Taylor showed that the equations of motion of a viscous fluid, including the nonlinear inertia terms, can be solved exactly for a class of two-dimensional flows that decay exponentially without changing shape. He gave the example of a square array of vortices, each rotating in the opposite direction to its four neighbors. This is the two-dimensional Taylor–Green vortex. Taylor calculated that an array of eddies 1 cm across would weaken to 1/e of its strength in about a third of a second in air, or four and a half seconds in water. Although the flow is named after both Taylor and Green, the two-dimensional solution was published by Taylor alone.

Taylor and Green's 1937 paper set out to study how the large eddies in a three-dimensional turbulent flow are broken down into smaller and smaller eddies until viscosity damps them, the process now known as the energy cascade. They called it "perhaps, the fundamental problem in turbulent motion". Two-dimensional flows lack this vortex-stretching mechanism because their vortex lines are perpendicular to the plane of motion and are not stretched. So they introduced a three-dimensional array of vortices and calculated its early evolution as a power series in time.

Later work used the three-dimensional flow to study how the smallest eddies become isotropic, with no preferred direction; how the rate of energy dissipation behaves at high Reynolds numbers; and whether solutions of the Euler equations, which describe a fluid without viscosity, can develop singularities in a finite time.

== Two-dimensional flow ==
The two-dimensional Taylor–Green vortex is the doubly periodic flow
$$u(x, y, t) = U_0\sin(kx) \cos(ky) \,F(t),$$
$$v(x, y, t) = -U_0\cos(kx) \sin(ky) \, F(t),$$
$$F(t) = e^{-2\nu k^2 t},$$
where $U_0$ is the maximum flow speed at $t=0$, $\nu$ is the kinematic viscosity, and $k$ is the wavenumber. The flow repeats every $2\pi/k$ in $x$ and $y$, each vortex fills a square cell of side $\pi/k$, and adjacent vortices rotate in opposite directions. The Reynolds number is $\mathrm{Re} = U_0/(k\nu)$, which is the definition Taylor and Green used for their three-dimensional flow. The pressure, which is determined only up to an added function of time, is
$$p(x, y, t) = \frac{\rho U_0^2}{4} \left[ \cos(2kx) + \cos(2ky) \right] F(t)^2,$$
where $\rho$ is the density of the fluid. The stream function $\psi$, defined by $u = \partial\psi/\partial y$ and $v = -\partial\psi/\partial x$, and the vorticity $\omega = \partial v/\partial x - \partial u/\partial y$ are
$$\psi(x, y, t) = \frac{U_0}{k}\sin(kx) \sin(ky) \,F(t),$$
$$\omega(x, y, t) = 2kU_0\sin(kx) \sin(ky) \,F(t).$$

The velocity components u and v, pressure p, stream function ψ, and vorticity ω of a two-dimensional Taylor–Green vortex at Reynolds number 100, from a simulation. Each field keeps its shape as it decays.

The velocity decays as $F(t)$, and the kinetic energy per unit mass and its rate of dissipation decay as $F(t)^2$. Averaged over a cell,
$$E(t) = \frac{1}{2}\left\langle u^2 + v^2 \right\rangle = \frac{U_0^2}{4}F(t)^2,$$
$$\varepsilon(t) = -\frac{\mathrm{d}E}{\mathrm{d}t} = \nu k^2 U_0^2 F(t)^2,$$
where the angle brackets denote the average over a square of side $\pi/k$, or over any whole number of cells.

Because it is exact, the solution often serves as a benchmark for numerical methods. Chorin used it in 1968 as the first test of his projection method, and Kim and Moin used it in 1985 to show that their fractional-step method is second-order accurate.

Lagrangian tracer particles in a Taylor–Green vortex, marked by their initial vertical position, showing how the flow deforms the fluid

=== Derivation ===
The velocity $\mathbf{u}=(u,v)$ and the pressure satisfy the incompressible Navier–Stokes equations
$$\frac{\partial \mathbf{u}}{\partial t} + (\mathbf{u}\cdot\nabla)\mathbf{u} = -\frac{1}{\rho}\nabla p + \nu\nabla^2\mathbf{u},$$
$$\nabla\cdot\mathbf{u} = 0.$$
In two dimensions the continuity equation is satisfied when $u$ and $v$ are written in terms of a stream function $\psi$, and the vorticity $\omega$ is then:
$$u = \frac{\partial \psi}{\partial y}, \qquad \qquad v = -\frac{\partial \psi}{\partial x},$$
$$\omega = \frac{\partial v}{\partial x} - \frac{\partial u}{\partial y} = -\nabla^2\psi.$$
Taking the curl of the momentum equation eliminates the pressure $p$. In two dimensions the vorticity is perpendicular to the plane of the flow, so it is not stretched or tilted, it is only advected by the flow and diffused by viscosity, giving us the two-dimensional vorticity equation:
$$\frac{\partial \omega}{\partial t} + (\mathbf{u}\cdot\nabla)\,\omega = \nu \nabla^2 \omega.$$

The only nonlinear term is the advection of vorticity, $(\mathbf{u}\cdot\nabla)\,\omega$. The velocity is tangent to the streamlines, the curves of constant $\psi$, so this term vanishes if the vorticity is constant along streamlines, that is, if $\omega$ is a function of the stream function alone, $\omega = f(\psi)$. The simplest such function is $\omega = \lambda\psi$, where $\lambda$ is a constant. Then $\psi$ must satisfy $\nabla^2\psi = -\lambda\psi$ so it is an eigenfunction of the Laplacian.

The vorticity equation then becomes
$$\frac{\partial\omega}{\partial t} = \nu\nabla^2\omega = -\lambda\nu\,\omega,$$
and separating the variables as $\psi(x, y, t) = \psi_0(x, y)\,F(t)$ gives
$$\frac{\mathrm{d}F}{\mathrm{d}t} = -\lambda\nu F,$$
so $F(t) = e^{-\lambda\nu t}$ and thus the flow keeps its shape and decays exponentially.

A square array of vortices is given by the eigenfunction
$$\psi_0(x, y) = \frac{U_0}{k}\sin(kx)\sin(ky),$$
$$\nabla^2\psi_0 = -2k^2\psi_0,$$
so $\lambda = 2k^2$ and $F(t) = e^{-2\nu k^2 t}$. Taking partial derivatives of $\psi(x, y, t)$ gives the velocity components $u$ and $v$, and $\omega = 2k^2\psi$ gives the vorticity.

The pressure follows from the momentum equation. Both $u$ and $v$ are also eigenfunctions of the Laplacian, with $\nabla^2 u = -2k^2 u$, and decay as $F(t)$. So the time derivative balances the viscous term,
$$\frac{\partial\mathbf{u}}{\partial t} = \nu\nabla^2\mathbf{u}.$$
The pressure gradient must therefore balance the nonlinear term:
$$-\frac{1}{\rho}\nabla p = (\mathbf{u}\cdot\nabla)\mathbf{u} = \frac{k U_0^2}{2} \left( \sin(2kx), \, \sin(2ky) \right) F(t)^2.$$
Integrating gives the pressure above, up to an added function of time. Without viscosity ($\nu = 0$), $F(t) = 1$, so the flow is a steady solution of the Euler equations.

The same argument works for any eigenfunction of the Laplacian, and each one gives a flow that decays exponentially without changing shape. Taylor pointed out that the same equation, $\nabla^2\psi = -\lambda\psi$, describes the modes of a vibrating membrane, so each mode of a membrane gives a flow whose streamlines are the membrane's contours. The analogy has limits though. The conditions at solid walls differ in the two problems, and while membrane modes can be added together, flows with different eigenvalues cannot in general be superposed, because their sum generally has a nonzero nonlinear advection term. Eigenfunctions with the same eigenvalue can be combined while preserving the proportionality between vorticity and stream function.

=== Stability ===
Simulations at Reynolds numbers 10, 100, 1000, and 10,000, each starting with the same initial conditions and small random disturbance. At low Re the vortices decay without changing shape. At high Re the array is unstable and breaks up.

The two-dimensional Taylor–Green vortex can be unstable to perturbations despite being an exact solution. For a steady base flow, an unstable normal mode grows exponentially while the perturbation remains small enough for linear theory to apply.

In viscous flow the vortex array itself decays, so stability studies commonly assume that disturbances develop much faster than the array decays. For the inviscid flow, numerical calculations identify an oscillatory, exponentially growing mode that can lead to nonlinear instability. The mode breaks symmetries of the vortex array and is concentrated near cell boundaries. It remains unstable when a small viscous term is added to the operator linearized about the fixed base flow. The same study identifies a non-modal growth mechanism involving changing disturbance structures rather than a single growing eigenmode.

Two kinds of instability are associated with the stagnation points of the flow, the points where the velocity is zero. The center of each vortex is an elliptic stagnation point, around which the fluid circles. Each corner of a cell, where four vortices meet, is a hyperbolic stagnation point where fluid arrives along two opposite cell edges and leaves along the other two, as around a saddle point, so the flow there stretches fluid in one direction and squeezes it in the other. The elliptic instability, at the vortex centers, occurs only when the disturbance is three-dimensional. The hyperbolic instability, at the corners, occurs even when the disturbance is two-dimensional, and the unstable mode described above is localized near the corners.

== Three-dimensional flow ==
Evolution of the three-dimensional Taylor–Green vortex at Reynolds number Re = 1600. The surfaces plotted enclose the 1% of the volume where the vorticity is strongest and are colored by the direction of the vortex lines: red pointing up, blue pointing down, and white horizontal. Thin vortex sheets form, roll up, and break down into small eddies, then the turbulence decays.

Taylor and Green's three-dimensional flow has the velocity $\mathbf{u}=(u,v,w)$ at time $t=0$
$$u(x, y, z) = A \cos(ax) \sin(by) \sin(cz),$$
$$v(x, y, z) = B \sin(ax) \cos(by) \sin(cz),$$
$$w(x, y, z) = C \sin(ax) \sin(by) \cos(cz),$$
where $A$, $B$, and $C$ are the constant velocity amplitudes of $u$, $v$, and $w$, and $a$, $b$, and $c$ are the wavenumbers in $x$, $y$, and $z$. Continuity $\nabla \cdot \mathbf{u} = 0$ requires $Aa+Bb+Cc=0$.

The three-dimensional flow has been described as "perhaps the simplest system in which one can study the generation of small scales by three-dimensional vortex stretching and the resulting turbulence". Unlike the two-dimensional flow, it does not keep its shape as vortex stretching intensifies the vorticity and produces smaller and smaller eddies.

The flow is a standard test case for direct numerical simulation and large eddy simulation codes. A common version, used at the First International Workshop on High-Order CFD Methods in 2012, starts from
$$\begin{align}
u(x, y, z) &= V_0 \sin\left(\frac{x}{L}\right)\cos\left(\frac{y}{L}\right)\cos\left(\frac{z}{L}\right),\\
v(x, y, z) &= -V_0 \cos\left(\frac{x}{L}\right)\sin\left(\frac{y}{L}\right)\cos\left(\frac{z}{L}\right),\\
w(x, y, z) &= 0,\\
p(x, y, z) &= p_0 + \frac{\rho_0 V_0^2}{16}\left[\cos\left(\frac{2x}{L}\right)+\cos\left(\frac{2y}{L}\right)\right]\left[\cos\left(\frac{2z}{L}\right)+2\right],
\end{align}$$
where $V_0$ is the initial velocity or the largest speed at $t = 0$, $L$ is the reference length so the cube has side $2\pi L$, $\rho_0$ is the reference density (equal to the uniform density in the incompressible case), and $p_0$ is the initial uniform part of the pressure. $L/V_0$ is the time unit or "the characteristic convective time".

The case uses a Reynolds number $\mathrm{Re} = \rho_0 V_0 L/\mu = 1600$, where $\mu$ is the dynamic viscosity. For incompressible flow this equals $V_0L/\nu$. Compressible calculations use a reference Mach number of 0.1. This is the special case that Taylor and Green worked out, with $A=-B=V_0$, $C=0$, and $a=b=c=1/L$, shifted by a quarter period in each direction. The initial velocity field depends on all three spatial coordinates, but $w=0$ and the streamlines lie in horizontal planes. Within each plane, the horizontal velocity has the two-dimensional Taylor–Green pattern with amplitude proportional to $\cos(z/L)$. A nonzero vertical velocity develops as the flow evolves.

=== Transition to turbulence ===
The flow maintains certain symmetries as it evolves. No fluid crosses the planes on which $x$, $y$, or $z$ is a multiple of $\pi L$, so the flow can be treated as confined to a cube of side $\pi L$ with impermeable, stress-free walls. And the flow in a cube of side $\pi L/2$ determines the flow everywhere.

At high Reynolds numbers the flow is nearly inviscid at first. In simulations at Re = 1600, vortex sheets form near the walls of the impermeable cube by about $t = 4L/V_0$ and roll up by $t = 5L/V_0$. By $t = 7L/V_0$ the rolled-up sheets undergo major changes in topology, and disordered patches of strong vorticity appear away from the walls, occupying a substantial fraction of the cube. The remaining coherent structures break down around $t = 8L/V_0$. Without external forcing, the turbulence subsequently decays. Although its decay has been compared with that of homogeneous isotropic turbulence, numerical studies find that the standard Taylor–Green flow retains anisotropy and spatial inhomogeneity even during late decay.

The same array of vortices at Reynolds number Re = 1600 in two dimensions (left) and sliced at z = πL/4 from the three-dimensional flow (right).

=== Extensions and related flows ===
Fully three-dimensional exact solutions of the Navier–Stokes equations are also known and are used in the same way to test three-dimensional solvers. One family of such solutions consists of Beltrami flows that can be regarded as a three-dimensional extension of Taylor's two-dimensional solution. Compressible, reacting, and magnetohydrodynamic versions of the flow are used to study how vortices interact with shock waves, flames, and electromagnetic fields.

== See also ==
- Lamb–Oseen vortex – also an exact solution for a single vortex
- Kovasznay flow – also an exact solution of the two-dimensional Navier–Stokes equations used to test numerical codes
- Arnold–Beltrami–Childress flow – an exact three-dimensional solution of the Euler equations
- Lid-driven cavity – a standard benchmark for numerical solvers of the incompressible Navier–Stokes equations
