= Engineering science and mechanics =

Engineering science and mechanics (ESM) is a multidisciplinary and interdisciplinary engineering program and/or academic department. It is available at various American universities, including Pennsylvania State University, University of Virginia, Virginia Polytechnic Institute and State University, Georgia Institute of Technology, and University of Alabama.

== Programs ==
A Bachelor of Science, Master of Science, Master of Engineering, or Ph.D. degree in engineering science, engineering mechanics, or engineering science and mechanics is awarded upon completion of the respective program.

Areas of specialization include aerodynamics, biomechanics, bionanotechnology, biosensors and bioelectronics, composite materials, continuum mechanics, data mining, electromagnetics of complex materials, electronic materials and devices, experimental mechanics, fluid mechanics, laser-assisted micromanufacturing, metamaterials, microfabrication, microfluidic systems, microelectromechanical systems (MEMS) and microoptoelectromechanical systems (MOEMS), nanotechnology, neural engineering, non-destructive testing or evaluation, nonlinear dynamics, optoelectronics, photonics and plasmonics, quantum mechanics, solar-energy-harvesting materials, solid mechanics, solid-state physics, structural health monitoring, and thin films and nanostructured materials.

== History ==
In 1972, the department of engineering mechanics at the Virginia Polytechnic Institute and State University changed its name and undergraduate program to engineering science and mechanics. In 1974, the department of engineering mechanics at the Pennsylvania State University merged with engineering science program and the department was renamed to engineering science and mechanics. Engineering science and mechanics is a graduate program in the School of Civil and Environmental Engineering at the Georgia Institute of Technology. The department of aerospace engineering and mechanics at the University of Alabama offers graduate degrees in engineering science and mechanics.

== Academic departments and programs ==
- Department of Engineering Science and Mechanics, Pennsylvania State University.
- Department of Engineering Science and Mechanics, Virginia Polytechnic Institute and State University.
- Graduate Programs in Engineering Science and Mechanics, Georgia Institute of Technology.
- Graduate Programs in Engineering Science and Mechanics, University of Alabama.

== See also ==
- Applied physics
- Applied mechanics
- Engineering physics
