= Philtre (disambiguation) =

A philtre is a potion, especially a love potion.

Philtre or Philter may also refer to:

- Le philtre, an 1831 opera by Daniel Auber
- Philtre, a 2005 album by Nitin Sawhney
- "Philter (In viaggio attraverso l'Australia)", a song from The Fantastic Plastic Machine
- Philter, stage name of Magnus Gangstad Jørgensen (born 1985), Norwegian electronic musician

== See also ==
- Filter (disambiguation)
