= Filter =

Filtration is a physical process that separates solid matter and fluid from a mixture.

Filter, filtering, filters or filtration may also refer to:

== Science and technology ==
=== Computing ===
- Filter (higher-order function), in functional programming
- Filter (software), a computer program to process a data stream
- Filter (video), a software component that performs some operation on a multimedia stream
- Information filtering system
  - Email filtering, the processing of email to organize it according to specified criteria
- Content-control software also known as an Internet filter
- Wordfilter, a script typically used on Internet forums or chat rooms
- Berkeley Packet Filter, filter expression used in the qualification of network data
- DSL filter, a low-pass filter installed between analog devices and a telephone line
- Helicon Filter, a raster graphics editor
- Filter (large eddy simulation), a mathematical operation intended to remove a range of small scales from the solution to the Navier-Stokes equations
- Kalman filter, an approximating algorithm in optimal control applications and problems
- Filter (social media), an appearance-altering digital image effect for social media

=== Device ===
- Filter (chemistry), a device which separates solids from fluids (liquids or gases) by adding a medium through which only the fluid can pass
  - Filter (aquarium), critical components of both freshwater and marine aquaria
  - Filter paper, a semi-permeable paper barrier placed perpendicular to a liquid or air flow. It is used to separate fine solids from liquids or air
  - Air filter, a device composed of fibrous materials which removes solid particulates such as dust, pollen, mold, and bacteria from the air
  - Oil filter, a filter to remove contaminants from engine oil, transmission oil, lubricating oil, or hydraulic oil
  - Pneumatic filter, a device which removes contaminants from a compressed air stream
  - Water filter, removes impurities from water by means of a fine physical barrier, a chemical process or a biological process
  - Cigarette filter, a part of a cigarette intended to filter the smoke inhaled by a smoker
  - Coffee filter, a utensil used to separate coffee grounds from liquid coffee
  - Fuel filter, found in most internal combustion engines
  - Filtration (wine)
- Sieve or macroscopic filter, a device for separating wanted elements from unwanted material

=== Mathematics ===
- Filter (mathematics), a special subset of a partially ordered set.
- Filter on a set, a special family of subsets that forms an (order theoretic) filter with respect to set inclusion
- Filters in topology, the use of collections of subsets to describe convergence.
- Filtering problem (stochastic processes), a mathematical model for a number of filtering problems in signal processing and the like.
- Filtration (mathematics), an indexed set of subobjects of a given algebraic structure S.

=== Optics ===
- Optical filter, selectively transmits light of different wavelengths
  - Interference filter, reflects one or more spectral bands or lines and transmits others, while maintaining a nearly zero coefficient of absorption for all wavelengths of interest
  - Dichroic filter, a very accurate color filter used to selectively pass light of a small range of colors while reflecting other colors
  - Hydrogen-alpha filter, an optical filter that transmits a narrow bandwidth of light centred on the H-alpha wavelength
  - Photographic filter, a camera accessory consisting of an optical filter that can be inserted in the optical path
  - Infrared cut-off filter, designed to reflect or block mid-infrared wavelengths while passing visible light
  - Chelsea filter, a dichromatic optical filter used for identifying coloured stones
  - Astronomical filter, a telescope accessory used to enhance the details of celestial objects

=== Signal processing ===
- Filter (signal processing)
  - Electronic filter, an electronic circuit which processes signals, for example to remove unwanted frequency components
  - Digital filter, a system that performs mathematical operations to reduce or enhance certain aspects of a signal
  - Analogue filter, a basic building block of signal processing much used in electronics
  - Filters used in digital image processing

== Arts and entertainment ==
- Filter (TV series), a show on the G4 channel
- Filter (magazine), an indie music magazine
- Filter Theatre, a British theatre company
- The Filter, a digital content services company based in England
- Filter (band), an American rock band
- "Filter", a song from the album Bend by 8stops7
- "Filter", a song from the album Map of the Soul: 7 by BTS
- "Filter", a song from the album Ruby by Jennie

== Other uses ==
- Biofilter, a pollution control technique using a bioreactor containing living material to capture and biologically degrade pollutants
- Filtering (housing), the process of housing units becoming more affordable with age
- Category-based filtering of perception, according to (objectivist interpretations of) Kant
  - Affective filter, an impediment to learning or acquisition caused by negative emotional ("affective") responses to one's environment
- Lane splitting, a practice that cyclists use to pass slow or stopped congested traffic
- The ability of a person to self-censor themselves (their thoughts) whilst speaking

== See also ==
- Filter coffee, a method for preparing coffee
- Filter feeder, an animal that strains food particles from water
- Filtration camp (disambiguation)
- Lifter (signal processing)
- Philtre (disambiguation)
- Separation process
- Ultrafilter
