= Vacuum ceramic filter =

Dewatering filter

A vacuum ceramic filter is designed to separate liquids from solids for dewatering of ore concentrates purposes. The device consists of a rotator, slurry tank, ceramic filter plate, distributor, discharge scraper, cleaning device, frame, agitating device, pipe system, vacuum system, automatic acid dosing system, automatic lubricating system, valve and discharge chute. The operation and construction principle of vacuum ceramic filter resemble those of a conventional disc filter, but the filter medium is replaced by a finely porous ceramic disc. The disc material is inert, has a long operational life and is resistant to almost all chemicals. Performance can be optimized by taking into account all those factors which affect the overall efficiency of the separation process. Some of the variables affecting the performance of a vacuum ceramic filter include the solid concentration, speed rotation of the disc, slurry level in the feed basin, temperature of the feed slurry, and the pressure during dewatering stages and filter cake formation.

== Range of applications ==
Vacuum ceramic filters are to be found in the following industries:

- paper making
- metallurgy
- water treatment
- chemical
- ore beneficiation process in mining (iron, gold, nickel, copper and quartz).

The process is used during a large continuous process of separating free filtering suspensions where washing is not required. Basically the filter works to separates solid-liquid mixtures by removing the water from mineral concentrates and moulding the feed slurries into pellets. This is accomplished by capillary action under low vacuum pressure. The pelletizing of the slurries is done by adding some solid matter to the sewage sludge so that water can be easily removed from the mixture. Eventually, the final cake products contain very little moisture and can be deposited as sewage. This process is commonly followed by bleaching and heating the cake. The end product of this filtration is a dry cake and filtrate containing no solid product.

== Advantages and limitations ==
The main advantage over other filtration systems is the reduction in energy consumption, up to 90% because no air flows through the discs due to the use of capillary force acting on the pores. Air breakthrough is prevented by the fine pores of the filter, thus allowing retention of higher vacuum levels. Therefore, the vacuum losses are less, which means the vacuum pump required is smaller than in conventional disc filters, thus minimizing operating costs. Power consumed by a vacuum ceramic filter with 45 m^{2} of filtration area is 15 kW while 170 kW is consumed by similar filters with cloth membranes.

Generally, conventional disc filters are not suitable for cake washing because the water quickly runs off the surface of the cake. As the cake solids are sprayed with a wash liquid to remove impurities, they are not suitable for conventional filtration systems where channelling or uneven distribution occurs, leading to cake cracking. However, cake washing has been proved to be more efficient with vacuum ceramic filters due to the steady flow profile and the even distribution of the cake.

A further advantage of vacuum ceramic filter is the high output capacity with a very low water content and drier filter cake. By comparison, the performance of a VDFK-3 ceramic filter was compared with the existing BOU-40 and BLN40-3 drum type vacuum filters to filter aluminium hydroxide. From the results, the average moisture content was 5% (abs? or rel?) lower when a vacuum ceramic filter was used.

Vacuum ceramic filters also have a longer service life while cloth filters have to be replaced, which eventually increases the moisture content of the cake, lowers the productivity and disturbs the production operations. In addition, the ceramic filter is both mechanically and chemically reliable enough to withstand regeneration.

Whilst the vacuum ceramic filter has proved to be a great innovation, there are still some limitations involved when operating the equipment. Ceramic filters exhibit large fluctuations in the recoiling washing pressure (0.05~0.35 MPa). This raises the short-term negative pressure and induces dilute acid due to the falling suck phenomenon. Therefore, the cleaning effect of the ceramic plates and the efficiency of the filter will be negatively affected.

== Designs available ==
There are many design criteria which vary according to the type of disc and the required filtering capacity. The typical filter for extracting iron contains 12 ceramic filtering plates of the filtering elements (discs), which have a diameter of about 2705 mm, making the total filter surface 120 m^{2}. This filter is most suited to filter feed slurries with high solid concentrations (5-20% w/w) and particles ranging in size from 1–700 μm. The area of the filters available in the ceramic filter is up to 45 m^{2}, making them useful for metal and mineral concentrate processing.

The ceramic discs are available in two types, cast plate and membrane plate. The cast plate is a one piece ceramic plate with a homogeneous surface and a granulated core. The filter medium of the cast plate is the thick walls, separated by ceramic granules. These features form a rigid mechanical structure. The membrane plate type contains a thin membrane over a coarser core and a multi-layer porous structure made of aluminium oxide. The coarse part of the equipment provides mechanical strength to its structure while the intermediate layer acts as a membrane carrier. The outer layer membrane acts as a filtering layer. The filtration layer of the ceramic filter has uniform pores, which means that only a certain size of particles can be filtered by using vacuum ceramic filters.

== Main process characteristics ==
There are at least three stages involve in the operation of a vacuum disc filter:

Stage 1: Cake formation

The discs rotate in a slurry trough, compartmentalized to reduce the volume held in it at any one time, and therefore to reduce the residence time of slurry in the trough. The time available for this stage depends on two factors, the rotation speed of the disc and the height of the slurry level in the basin. A vacuum is applied inside the discs to promote cake filtration.

Stage 2: Cake dewatering

Washing is largely restricted to the upper portions where the cake surface is nearly horizontal in orientation, which occurs at the temperature of the feed. The ceramic filter uses a sintered alumina disc to dewater slurry under low vacuum. The dewatering occurs by drawing water from the slurry by capillary action. This ensures that no air or particles are drawn into the filter medium to cause blockage. However, if too much wash water is applied then it can cascade down the cake and into the feed trough, where it merely dilutes the slurry.

Stage 3: Cake drying

The final water (moisture) content in the cake is regulated by passing dry (cold or hot) air or gas through the cake. Drying time is dependent on the distribution valve timing, slurry level on the basin, rotation speed, and scraper position.

Stage 4: Cake discharge

These are the typical conditions for the overall operation of the vacuum ceramic filter:

- Slurry level: must be higher than the top of the sectors as they pass through the trough (otherwise air would simply pass through the cloth during cake formation).
- Solids throughput: up to 4,000 kg/m^{2}h
- Typical filtration capacity: 200-5,000 L/m^{2}h
- Typical air consumption/ flow rate: 50–80 m^{3}/h·m^{2} at 500 Torr vacuum
- Pressure difference: Typically, the pressure difference with ceramic disc is between 0.90 and 0.95 bar. However, pressure differences across the filter are usually limited to less than 85 kPa making it possible to process a wide range of feed materials in a continuous manner.
- Rotating speed: Higher rotating speeds enable greater solid production rates by formation of thinner cakes. However, this may not be wholly desirable as washing efficiency is likely to be compromised. Moreover, an increased rotating speed requires more electrical power.
- Minimum cake thickness: 3/8-1/2 in or 10–13 mm (for effective discharge)
- Submergence required for cake discharge: 25% of cycle
- Effective maximum submergence of the disk: 28% of cycle.

== Assessment of main characteristics ==
The most important operating parameters of disc filters are the height of the slurry tank, agitation and the intensity and rotation speed of the disc as these will determine the cake formation and drying times. It is important to continuously agitate the slurry in order to prevent sedimentation of the solids. Excessively high agitation intensity may affect cake formation or change the particle size distribution of the product. One of the most commonly used agitators for filtration using vacuum disc filters is an oscillating cradle-type agitator located in the bottom of the basin, which requires fairly high rotation speeds to form homogeneous slurry. For processing rapidly settling high concentration slurries, bottom-feed rotary disc filters are usually used.

Stage 1: Filtration

The filtrate from the internal passages of the discs is removed by the low vacuum used in the filter, while the small pressure differential across the disc causes cake formation. With a thicker cake produced in this stage, more effective washing is achieved at higher wash liquor flows. However, this causes larger air volumes to be consumed at discharge due to reduced resistance and marginally lower cake moisture.

Stage 2: Dewatering

In rare cases, due to the even structure of the cakes formed, the steady flow profile of the ceramic filter media and the gas free filtrate flow cake, washing has proved to be efficient in ceramic disc filters. The formation of thicker cakes during filtration and higher vacuum level leads to greater removal of solute.

Stage 3: Discharge

The basic scraper works well when the cakes are relatively thick and non-sticky. The final cakes are discharged by blade or wire scrapers on either side of the discs However, other types of agitators should be considered and installed if the cake is sticky or thin. An air blow-back system is often employed to aid cake removal where wetter cakes are discharged from disc filter.

== Design heuristics ==
Rate of cake buildup	Rate	Medium used for filtration
Rapid	0.1-10.0 cm/s	Belts, top feed drums, pusher-type centrifuges
Medium	0.1-10.0 cm/min	Vacuum drums, disks, peeler type centrifuges
Slow	0.1- 10.0 cm/h	Pressure filters, sedimentation centrifuges

- If it takes more than five minutes to form 1/8 in. cake thicknesses, continuous filtration should not be attempted.
- For negligible cake build up in clarification, cartridges, pre-coat drums, or sand filters are used for filtration
- When the filtering surface is expected to be more than a few square meters, it is advisable to do laboratory tests to determine whether cake washing is critical. If there is a problem with the cake drying, filter precoating might be needed.
- For finely ground ores and minerals, rotary drum filtration rates may be 1500 lb/(day)(sqft), at 20 rev/h and 18-25 inch Hg vacuum
- Coarse solids and crystals may be filtered at rates of 6000 lb/ (day) (sqft) at 20 rev/h, 2-6 inch Hg vacuum.
- Surface areas in porous ceramics: Porous ceramics processed by a sol-gel technique have extremely large surface areas, ranging from 200 to 500 square meters per gram

== Waste stream production and post-treatment ==
Filtrate is the waste that has been discharge in vacuum ceramic filters through the waste stream. During cake washing, a wash liquid is sprayed on the cake solids to remove impurities or additional filtrate. The filtrate goes into filtrate tank and is drained through a discharge system. However, the filtrate is recyclable and has low suspended solid content. Thus, it can be recycled through the system without further treatment. Filtrate is used to flush the disc during back flow washing to clean the micro-porous structure and remove any residual cake.

== New developments ==
One improvement over the standard design of ceramic vacuum filter is to use serialized pore size distributions of non-fibrous porous ceramic filters. The porosity of this type of ceramic can be varied from 20% to 60% by volume, which allows a low-pressure drop of liquid and gas flow. Custom sizes from 1 mm diameter/0.5 mm bore of porous ceramic filters are available for a range of designs. A non-fibrous porous ceramic filter is more resistant in alkaline and acidic conditions compared to fibrous ceramic filters. Thus, it has a longer service life as it has good wearing and erosion resistance as well as being able to withstand high temperatures.

Another improvement is applied at the regeneration stage when the residual filter cake is removed by back-flushing the clean plant water to wash the internal ceramic filter. Filter cake dewatering of ceramic filters produces low final cake moistures at minimum operation and maintenance costs. The residuals moisture are removed from the filter cake due to capillary action within the ceramic elements, which rotate above the slurry level. This process gives maximum filtration, and the final cake can be maintained at the lowest moisture content due to the effective cleaning of both ceramic sectors. In addition, performance can be optimized by using an ultrasonic cleaning system to achieve efficient operation conditions for regeneration of plates. The use of filtrate in looped water cycle in the design operation can reduce the water consumption up to 30-50%. High filtrate purity can be obtained, as there is only 0.001-0.005 g/L solids in the filtrate produced from this process. This eventually results in the reduction of polymer flocculant consumption in thickeners. Ceramic scraper knives have been introduced to this design as they are able to shave through the mass formed in filter cake dewatering. The remaining layer of solid residue on the filter provides protection from mechanical abrasion. Therefore, the maintenance costs can be reduced while the service life of the ceramic filter increases.

== See also ==
- Rotary vacuum-drum filter
