= Homogeneous isotropic turbulence =

Within the field of fluid dynamics, Homogeneous isotropic turbulence is an idealized version of the realistic turbulence, but amenable to analytical studies. The concept of isotropic turbulence was first introduced by G.I. Taylor in 1935. The meaning of the turbulence is given below,

- homogeneous, the statistical properties are invariant under arbitrary translations of the coordinate axes
- isotropic, the statistical properties are invariant over a full rotation group, which includes rotations and reflections of the coordinate axes.

G.I. Taylor also suggested a way of obtaining almost homogeneous isotropic turbulence by passing fluid over a uniform grid. The theory was further developed by Theodore von Kármán and Leslie Howarth (Kármán–Howarth equation) under dynamical considerations. Kolmogorov's theory of 1941 was developed using Taylor's idea as a platform.
