= DSR =

DSR may refer to:

== Science and technology ==
- Dynamic shear rheometer, used for research and development as well as for quality control in the manufacture of a wide range of materials
- Doubly special relativity, a proposed modification of Einstein's special relativity theory
- Dynamic steering response, a car safety technology
- Design science research, a set of analytical techniques and perspectives for performing IS research
- Differential stress resistance protects during starvation normal but not cancer cells against high-dose chemotherapy

=== Computing ===
- Data Set Ready, an RS-232 signal used by a modem to indicate to the computer that it is ready to receive data
- Dynamic Source Routing protocol, an on-demand routing protocol for ad hoc networks
- Dynamic Super Resolution, a feature of Nvidia's Fermi and newer series of graphics cards
- Device Status Report (ANSI), an ANSI X3.64 escape sequence
- Data signaling rate, in telecommunication
- Direct Server Return, in telecommunication

== Organizations ==
- Dansk Sygeplejeråd, The Danish Nurses' Organization
- Digital Systems Resources, a private defense contractor acquired by General Dynamics in 2003
- Donor Sibling Registry, a US organization serving donors
- Deputy Superintendent Rangers, a Pakistan Rangers Gazetted officer rank equivalent to the Captain rank of Armed forces

== Sports ==
- Daily Scratch Rating, a component of the Golf Australia Handicap System
- Don Schumacher Racing, NHRA Top Fuel drag racing team of Tony Schumacher and other drivers
- Detroit Sports Report, a sports highlight show broadcast on FSN Detroit

== Other uses ==
- Dark Souls: Remastered, a remaster of the 2011 action role-playing game Dark Souls
- Demand-side response, a form of energy system demand management
- Data structure report, an archaeological report, which is the initial report written for an archaeological site in Scotland
- Designed sanitary relief, a civil engineering structure designed to relieve wet weather flows from municipal sanitary systems
- Digital Stream/Satellite Rip, in pirated movie release types
- Consumer Protection (Distance Selling) Regulations 2000 or Distance Selling Regulations
- Detailed Seller Ratings, a rating system employed by eBay that allows buyers to anonymously rate sellers in four categories while leaving feedback
- Dating, Sex and Relationships - used by manosphere
- Household debt service ratio, ratio of debt to income
