= List of University of Mysore people =

This is a list of notable alumni and faculty of the University of Mysore.

== Notable faculty ==
Name	Affiliation	Notability	References
Brajendra Nath Seal			
N. S. Subba Rao	Professor, Principal and Vice Chancellor (1937–42)	Economist	
D. L. Narasimhachar			
H. V. Nanjundaiah			
Kuvempu	Various posts at Maharaja's College and Central College, Bangalore; Retired as Vice-Chancellor in 1960. (Note: The Central College, Bangalore was affiliated to the University of Mysore until 1964.)	novelist	
N. V. Madhusudana			
Ranganathan Shashidhar			
S. Pancharatnam			
S. Srikanta Sastri	Head of the Department of History & Indology at Maharaja's College		
M. Yamunacharya	Professor of Philosophy at Maharaja's College		
Sarvepalli Radhakrishnan	Professor of Philosophy between 1918 and 1921	2nd President of India	
Shikaripura Ranganatha Rao		archaeologist who led teams credited with the discovery of a number of Harappan sites	
Sivaramakrishna Chandrasekhar	Head of the Department of Physics		
Mysore Manjunath	Professor, Department of Music	Violinist	
R. Indira	Professor, Head of the Department of Sociology	Socialist	
Aravinda Malagatti	Professor, Director of Kuvempu Institute of Kannada Studies, Director of Prasaranga	Writer, thinker	

== Notable alumni ==
=== Arts ===
Name	Class Year	Degree	College	Notability	References
Priyadarshini	2021	Ph.D Film Music	University of Mysore	playback singer, musician	
Avinash		MA	University of Mysore	actor	
Baadal Nanjundaswamy				street artist	
R. K. Laxman		BA		artist, cartoonist, and illustrator	

=== Business ===
Name	Class Year	Degree	College	Notability	References
N.R. Narayana Murthy	1967		National Institute of Engineering (Note: The National Institute of Engineering used to be affiliated to the University of Mysore.)	founder of Infosys	
N. S. Narendra	1990		National Institute of Engineering	founder of FirePro Systems	

=== Humanities and Social Sciences ===
Name	Class Year	Degree	College	Notability	References
M. S. Nagaraja Rao				epigraphist and archaeologist; former Director General of the Archaeological Survey of India	
Ismail Mashal				Afghan journalist, professor, and women's education activist	
K Bhogishayana	1952	MA		Vice Chancellor of Shivaji University	

=== Law ===
Name	Class Year	Degree	College	Notability	References
Engalaguppe Seetharamiah Venkataramiah			Maharaja's	19th Chief Justice of India	
Vishnu S. Warrier			Mahajanas	Author	

=== Politics ===
Name	Class Year	Degree	College	Notability	References
Akhilesh Yadav			Sri Jayachamarajendra	former Chief Minister of Uttar Pradesh	
K. Shivram				politician	

=== Science and Technology ===
Name	Class Year	Degree	College	Notability	References
C. N. R. Rao	1951			chemist; Recipient of the Bharat Ratna and Legion of Honour	
Kalappa Muniyappa	1974; 1976			molecular biologist and geneticist	
Kalya Jagannath Rao	1960; 1961	BSc; MSc		physical chemist and a Professor Emeritus at the Indian Institute of Science	
M. J. Thirumalachar				mycologist, microbiologist, plant pathologist	
P. S. Ayyaswamy	1962	BE		Asa Whitney Professor of Dynamical Engineering at the University of Pennsylvania	
Tavarekere Kalliah Chandrashekar				bioinorganic chemist	
V. K. Aatre	1961	BE (Electrical Engineering)	University Visvesvaraya (Note: The University Visvesvaraya College of Engineering used to be affiliated to the University of Mysore between 1918 and 1964.)	former head of the Defence Research and Development Organisation	
Vijay Kumar Kapahi			St Joseph's College, Bangalore (Note: St Joseph's College, Bangalore used to be affiliated to the University of Mysore.)	astrophysicist; Director of the National Centre for Radio Astrophysics	

=== Sports ===
Name	Class Year	Degree	College	Notability	References
Javagal Srinath		BE	Sri Jayachamarajendra	cricketer	

=== Philosophy ===
Name	Class Year	Degree	College	Notability	References
M. Yamunacharya					
