= Bachor =

Bachor is a surname. Notable people with the surname include:

- Hans A. Bachor (born 1952), Australian research scientist
- Isabell Bachor (born 1983), German footballer
- Jim Bachor, mosaic artist
- Rip Bachor (1901–1959), American football player
- Willy Bachor (1921–2008), Wehrmacht Oberwachtmeister
