= Muniyappa =

Muniyappa or Muniappa are names. People with the names include:

== Muniyappa ==
- K. H. Muniyappa
- V. Muniyappa
- Chinnaswamy Muniyappa
- Kalappa Muniyappa
- K. H. Muniyappa

== Muniappa ==
- Hanumappa Muniappa Reddy
