= Patchwork roads =

Road surface consisting of multiple discrete repairs

A patchwork road is an informal term used to describe a road surface that contains numerous small repair patches rather than a single continuous pavement layer. The term is commonly applied where repeated pothole repairs or utility reinstatements have produced a surface with multiple discrete patch repairs. Although the expression is not used in formal engineering standards, the physical condition it refers to corresponds to the recognised pavement distress types of patching and utility-cut reinstatement in the Pavement Condition Index (PCI) system.

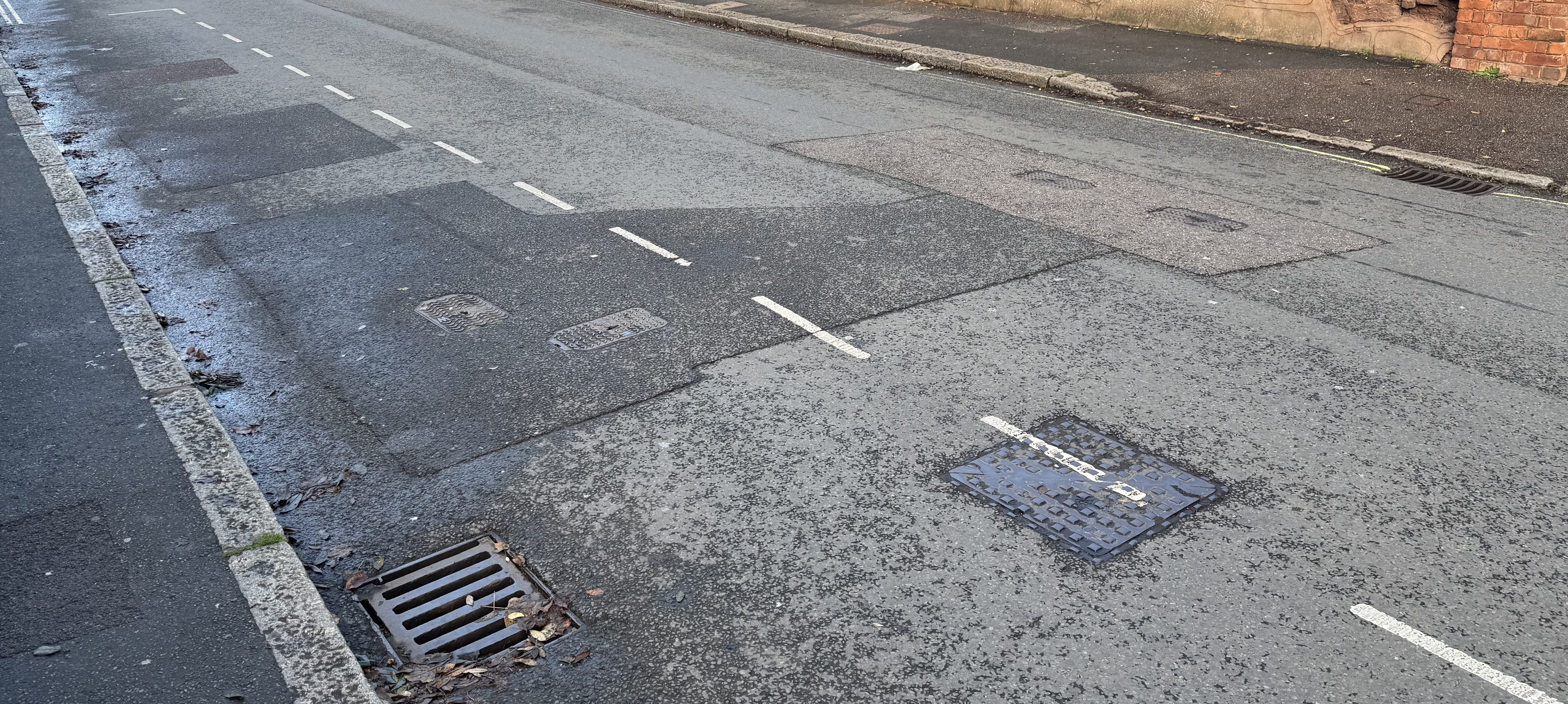
Example of a patchwork road showing multiple utility reinstatement patches in Exeter, UK.

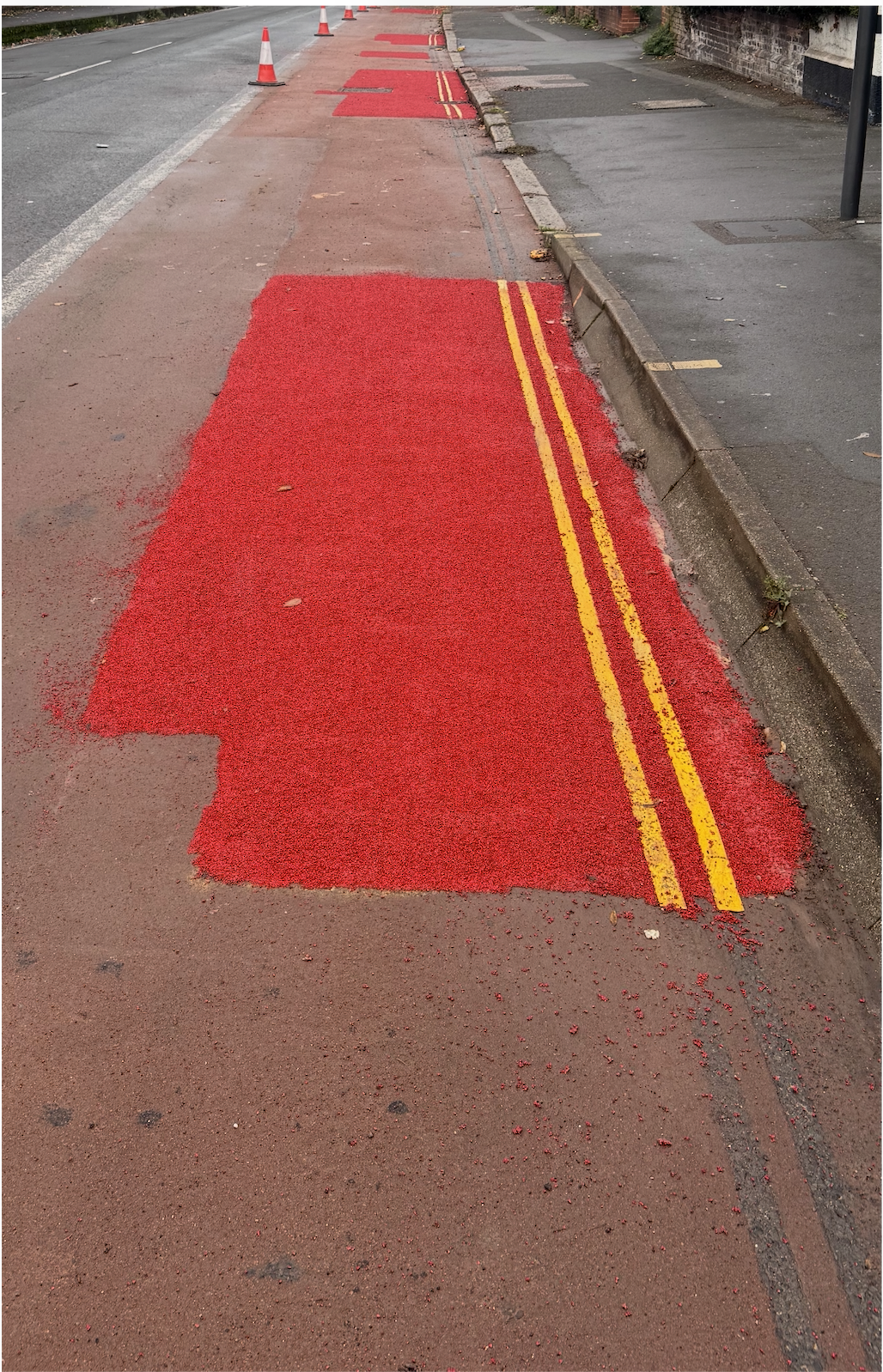
Example of a patchwork road in Exeter, UK, where multiple reinstatement patches have been applied. The high-contrast surfacing makes the original double yellow lines difficult to distinguish, illustrating how patch repairs can affect road marking visibility and consistency.

== Usage in media ==
In the UK, the term patchwork road has been used in a range of public communications, with some examples being:

- Highland Council opposition leader Councillor Raymond Bremner criticised "poor patchwork pothole filling" on local roads in an interview with the Inverness Courier.
- A private-sector blog article advising readers on how to check local road repair schedules, the resurfacing firm Smart Surfacing Solutions described some UK roads as "more like patchwork than proper pavement".
- Reporting on a BBC Freedom of Information request that revealed more than £4 million had been spent repairing over 21,000 potholes in Suffolk, the transport industry site Safer Highways noted that motorists engaged with described the results as resembling a "patchwork cushion".

== Relation to engineering terminology ==
In technical pavement surveys, the relevant distress categories are recorded as patching or utility-cut patching. These are defined in the Pavement Condition Index (PCI) methodology and standardised in ASTM D6433.

In the United Kingdom, reinstatement work following street openings is governed by the Specification for the Reinstatement of Openings in Highways (SROH).

== Causes ==
Pavements develop a patchwork appearance when repairs are carried out as small, individual reinstatements rather than by resurfacing a larger area. Activities that contribute to the development of patchwork roads include:

- excavation and reinstatement for underground utility works;
- repeated pothole patching carried out over several years;
- differential settlement where reinstatement materials and compaction differ from the surrounding pavement;
- deferred resurfacing caused by funding or scheduling constraints.

== Documented effects ==
Research and agency reports have recorded the following impacts:

- Utility-cut patches may reduce ride quality (higher IRI values) even when compliant with specifications.
- Studies commissioned by cities including Phoenix, Los Angeles, Sacramento, Austin, Kansas City, and Burlington have each reported reduced pavement service life on road sections containing utility cuts. Findings showed a 4.5-year reduction in pavement life in Phoenix, with Los Angeles reporting a drop to 16.5 years from 25 for arterial streets.
- The Federal Highway Administration notes that agencies use fee-based policies to recover lifecycle impacts from utility cuts, such as pavement degradation or restoration fees. For example, San Francisco's has their "street damage restoration fee," which ranges from $1.00 per square foot ($10.8/m^{2}) on streets 15–20 years old to $3.50 per square foot ($37.7/m^{2}) on streets less than five years old.

== Mitigation ==
Responses used in pavement management include:

- resurfacing or preservation treatments applied to whole sections rather than individual patches;
- quality-controlled reinstatement in accordance with SROH or equivalent specifications;
- coordination of utility works to reduce repeated cutting of the same road;
- fee structures or moratoria on cutting newly resurfaced streets.

== See also ==
- Pavement Condition Index
- International Roughness Index
- Utility cut
- Pothole
- Pavement engineering
