= Capillary breakup rheometry =

Experimental physical technique

Capillary breakup rheometry is an experimental technique used to assess the extensional rheological response of low viscous fluids. Unlike most shear and extensional rheometers, this technique does not involve active stretch or measurement of stress or strain but exploits only surface tension to create a uniaxial extensional flow. Hence, although it is common practice to use the name rheometer, capillary breakup techniques should be better addressed to as indexers.

Capillary breakup rheometry is based on the observation of breakup dynamics of a thin fluid thread, governed by the interplay of capillary, viscous, inertial and elastic forces. Since no external forcing is exerted in these experiments, the fluid thread can spatially rearrange and select its own time scales. Quantitative observations about strain rate, along with an apparent extensional viscosity and the breakup time of the fluid, can be estimated from the evolution of the minimal diameter of the filament. Moreover, theoretical considerations based on the balance of the forces acting in the liquid filament, allow to derive information such as the extent of non-Newtonian behaviour and the relaxation time. The information obtained in capillary breakup experiments are a very effective tool in order to quantify heuristic concepts such as "stringiness" or "tackiness", which are commonly used as performance indices in several industrial operations.

At present, the unique commercially available device based on capillary breakup technique is the CaBER.

== Theoretical framework ==
Capillary breakup rheometry and its recent development are based on the original experimental and theoretical work of Schümmer and Tebel and Entov and co-workers. Nonetheless, this technique found his origins at end of the 19th century with the pioneering work of Joseph Plateau and Lord Rayleigh. Their work entailed considerable progress in describing and understanding surface-tension-driven flows and the physics underlying the tendency of falling liquid streams to spontaneously break into droplets. This phenomenon is known as Plateau–Rayleigh instability.

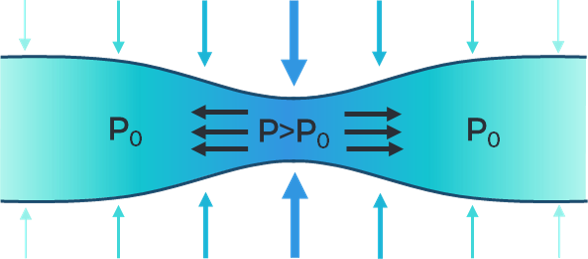
Uniaxial extensional flow created within necked filament by a capillary instability

The linear stability analysis introduced by Plateau and Rayleigh can be employed to determine a wavelength for which a perturbation on a jet surface is unstable. In this case, the pressure gradient across the free-surface can cause the fluid in the thinnest region to be "squeezed" out towards the swollen bulges, thus creating a strong uniaxial extensional flow in the necked region.

As the instability grows and strains become progressively larger, the thinning is governed by non-linear effects. Theoretical considerations on the fluid motion suggested that the behaviour approaching the breakup singularity can be captured using self-similarity. Depending on the relative intensity of inertial, elastic and viscous stresses, different scaling laws based on self-similar considerations have been established to describe the trend of the filament profile near breakup throughout the time.

== Experimental configurations ==
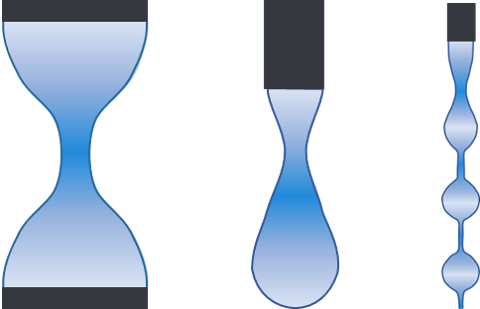
Experimental configurations used to study free surface flows. From left: liquid bridge, dripping, jetting

Capillary thinning and breakup of complex fluids can be studied using different configurations. Historically, mainly three types of free-surface conformations have been employed in experiments: statically-unstable liquid bridges, dripping from a nozzle under gravity and continuous jets. Even though the initial evolution of the capillary instability is affected by the type of conformation used, each configurations capture the same phenomenon at the last stages close to breakup, where thinning dynamics is dominated by fluid properties exclusively.

The different configurations can be best distinguished based on the Weber Number, hence on the relative magnitude between the imposed velocity and the intrinsic capillary speed of the considered material, defined as the ratio between the surface tension and shear viscosity ($\gamma/\eta$). In the first geometry, the imposed velocity is zero (We=0), after an unstable liquid bridge is generated by rapid motion of two coaxial cylindrical plate. The thinning of the capillary bridge is purely governed by the interplay of inertial, viscous, elastic and capillary forces. This configuration is employed in the CaBER device and it is at present the most used geometry, thanks to its main advantage of maintaining the thinnest point of the filament approximately located in the same point. In dripping configuration, the fluid leaves a nozzle at a very low velocity (We < 1), allowing the formation of a hemispherical droplet at the tip of the nozzle. When the drop becomes sufficiently heavy, gravitational forces overcome surface tension, and a capillary bridge is formed, connecting the nozzle and the droplet. As the drop falls, the liquid filament becomes progressively thinner, to the point in which gravity becomes unimportant (low Bond number) and the breakup is only driven by capillary action. At this stage, the thinning dynamics is determined by the balance between capillarity and fluid properties. Lastly, the third configuration consists in a continuous jet exiting a nozzle at a velocity higher than the intrinsic capillary velocity (We > 1). As the fluid leaves the nozzle, capillary instabilities naturally emerge on the jet and the formed filaments progressively thin as they are being convected downstream with the flow, until eventually the jet breaks into separate droplets. The jetting-based configuration is generally less reproducible compared to the former two due to different experimental challenges, such as accurately controlling the sinusoidal disturbance.

== Force balance and apparent extensional viscosity ==
The temporal evolution of the thinnest region is determined by a force balance in the fluid filament. A simplified approximate force balance can be written as

$\eta_{E}\dot{\epsilon}_{min}(t)\approx\frac{\gamma}{D_{min}(t)/2}-\left[\tau_{zz}-\tau_{rr} \right]$

where $\gamma$ is the surface tension of the fluid, $\dot{\epsilon}_{mid}$ the strain rate at filament midpoint, $\eta_{E}$ the extensional viscosity, and the term in square brackets represents the non-Newtonian contribution to the total normal stress difference. The stress balance shows that, if gravity and inertia can be neglected, the capillary pressure $\gamma/D_{min}$ is counteracted by viscous extensional contribution $3\eta_{s}\dot{\epsilon}_{min}(t)$ and by non-Newtonian (elastic) contribution.

Depending on the type of fluid, appropriate constitutive models have to be considered and to extract the relevant material functions. Without any consideration on the nature of the tested fluid, it is possible to obtain a quantitative parameter, the apparent extensional viscosity $\eta_{E,app}(t)$ directly from the force balance, among capillary pressure and viscous stresses alone. Assuming an initial cylindrical shape of the filament, the strain rate evolution is defined as

$\dot{\epsilon}(t)=-\frac{2}{D_{min}}\frac{dD_{min}}{dt}$

Thus, the apparent extensional viscosity is given by

$\eta_{E,app}(t)=\frac{\gamma}{\frac{dD_{min}(t)}{dt}}$

== Scaling laws ==
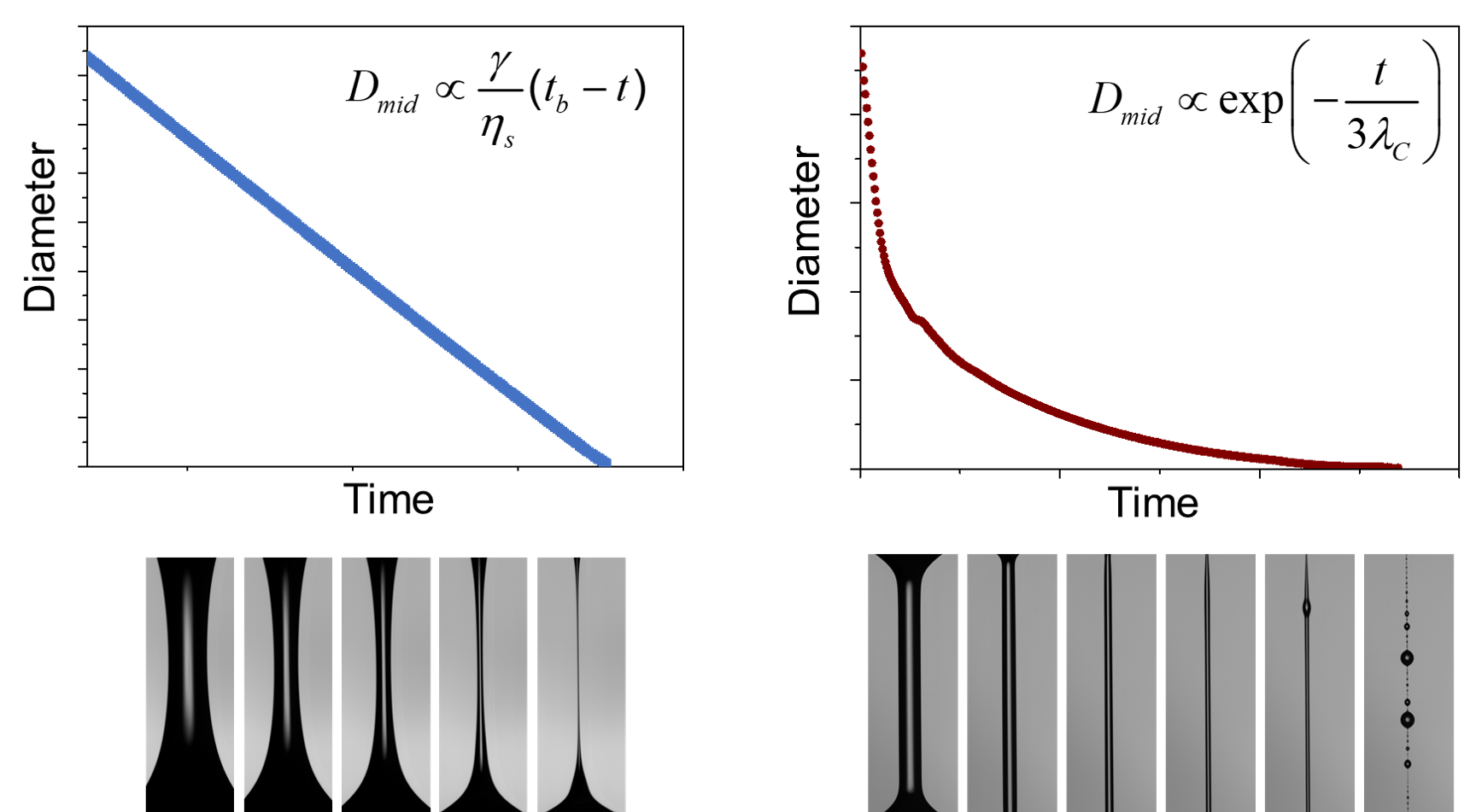
Temporal evolution of the midpoint filament diameter, scaling laws and high-resolution images of capillary breakup experiments for different fluid. From left: visco-capillary thinning (silicone oil) and elasto-capillary thinning (PEO in water solution)

The behaviour of the fluid determines the relative importance of the viscous and elastic terms in resisting the capillary action. Combining the force balance with different constitutive models, several analytical solutions were derived to describe the thinning dynamics. These scaling laws can be used to identify fluid type and extract material properties.

=== Scaling law for visco-capillary thinning of Newtonian fluids ===
In absence of inertia (Ohnesorge number larger than 1) and gravitational effects, the thinning dynamics of a Newtonian fluid are governed purely by the balance between capillary pressure and viscous stresses. The visco-capillary thinning is described by the similarity solution derived by Papageorgiou, the midpoint diameter temporal evolution may be written as:

$D_{min}(t)=0.1418\frac{\gamma}{\eta_{s}}(t_{b}-t)$

According to the scaling law, a linear decay of the filament diameter in time and the filament breaking in the middle are the characteristic fingerprint of visco-capillary breakup. A linear regression of experimental data allows to extract the time-to-breakup $t_{b}$ and the capillary speed.

=== Scaling law for elasto-capillary thinning of elastic fluids ===
For non-Newtonian elastic fluids, such as polymer solutions, an elasto-capillary balance governs the breakup dynamics. Different constitutive models were used to model the elastic contribution (Oldroyd-B, FENE-P,...). Using an upper convected Maxwell constitutive model, the self-similar thinning process is described by an analytical solution of the form

$\frac{D_{min}(t)}{D_{0}}=\left( \frac{GD_{0}}{4\gamma} \right)^{1/3}exp\left(-t/3\lambda_{c}\right)$

where $D_{0}$ is the initial diameter of the filament. A linear regression of experimental data allows to extract $G$ the elastic modulus of the polymer in the solution and $\lambda_{c}$ the relaxation time. The scaling law expresses an exponential decay of the filament diameter in time

The different forms of the scaling law for viscoelastic fluids shows that their thinning behaviour is very distinct from that of Newtonian liquids. Even the presence of a small amount of flexible polymers can significantly alter the breakup dynamics. The elastic stresses generated by the presence of polymers rapidly increase as the filament diameter decreases. The liquid filament is then progressively stabilized by the growing stresses, and it assumes a uniform cylindrical shape, contrary to the case of visco-capillary thinning where the minimum diameter is localized at the filament midpoint.

== Instruments ==
=== CaBER ===
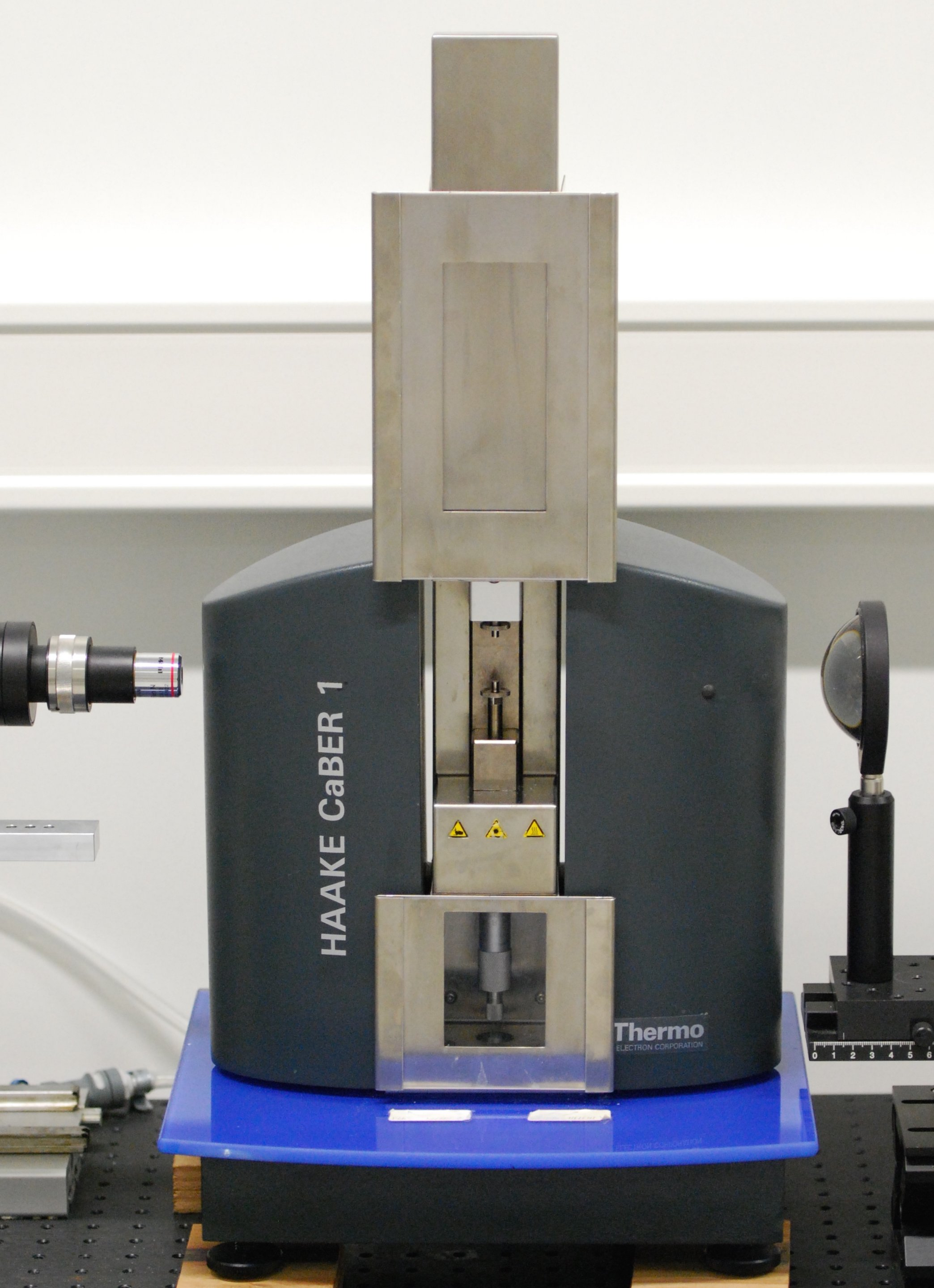
A CaBER in use in a research laboratory

The CaBER (Capillary Breakup Extensional Rheometer) was the only commercially available instrument based on capillary breakup. Based on the experimental work of Entov, Bazilevsky and co-workers, the CaBER was developed by McKinley and co-workers at MIT in collaboration with the Cambridge Polymer Group in the early 2000s. It was manufactured by Thermo Scientific with the commercial name HAAKE CaBER 1.

The CaBER experiments employ a liquid bridge configuration and can be thought as a quantitative version of a "thumb & forefinger" test. In CaBER experiments, a small amount of sample is placed between two measurement plates, forming an initial cylindrical configuration. The plates are then rapidly separated over a short predefined distance: the imposed step strain generates an "hour-glass" shaped liquid bridge. The necked sample subsequently thins and eventually breaks under the action of capillary forces. During the surface-tension-driven thinning process, the evolution of the mid-filament diameter (D_{mid}(t)) is monitored via a laser micrometre.

The raw CaBER output (D_{mid} vs time curve) show different characteristic shapes depending on the tested liquid, and both quantitative and qualitative information can be extracted from it. The time-to-breakup is the most direct qualitative information that can be obtain. Although this parameter does not represent a property of the fluid itself, it is certainly useful to quantify the processability of complex fluids. In terms of quantitative parameters, rheological properties such as the shear viscosity and the relaxation time can be obtained by fitting the diameter evolution data with the appropriate scaling laws. The second quantitative information that can be extracted is the apparent extensional viscosity.

Despite the great potential of the CaBER, this technique also presents a number of experimental challenges, mainly related to the susceptibility to solvent evaporation and the creation of a statically-unstable bridge of very low visco-elastic fluids, for which the fluid filament often happens to break already during the stretch phase. Different modifications of the commercial instrument have been presented to overcome these issues. Amongst others: the use of surrounding media different than air and the Slow Retraction Method (SRM).

=== Other techniques ===
High speed videos of capillary breakup experiments carried out with different techniques. From left: CaBER test on a water-glycerol solution, DoS and ROJER tests on PEO in water solutions

In recent years a number of different techniques have been developed to characterize fluid with very low visco-elasticity, commonly not able to be tested in CaBER devices.

- The Cambridge Trimaster a fluid is symmetrically stretched to form an unstable liquid bridge. This instrument is similar to the CaBER, but the higher imposed stretch velocity of 150 mm/s prevents sample breakup during the stretching step in case of low visco-elastic sample.
- The ROJER (Rayleigh Ohnesorge Jetting Extensional Rheometer) is a jetting-based rheometer, developed on the basis of earlier works of Schümmer and Tebel and Christanti and Walker. This device exploits the spontaneous capillary instabilities developing on a liquid jet issuing from a nozzle to evaluate very short relaxation times. A piezoelectric transducer is used to control the frequency and the amplitude of the imposed perturbation.
- The DoS (Dripping-onto-Substrate) technique allows to characterize the extensional response of a variety of complex fluids as well as accessing very short relaxation times not measurable in CaBER experiments. In DoS experiments, a volume of fluid is deposited on a substrate, so that an unstable liquid bridge is formed between the nozzle and the sessile drop.
- The ADMiER (Acoustically-Driven Microfluidic Extensional Rheometer) involves subjecting a sessile droplet resting on a piezoelectric substrate to a rapid pulse of surface acoustic radiation. This elongates the droplet into a filament that then contacts an opposing surface to form a liquid bridge. At this point, the pulse is ceased and the unstable liquid bridge thins under capillary action, as in a conventional CaBER device. This chief advantage is that ADMiER allows the interrogation of tiny (1 microliter) samples of low-viscosity complex fluids.

== Applications ==
There are many processes and applications that involves free-surface flows and uniaxial extension of liquid filaments or jets. Using capillary breakup rheometry to quantify the dynamics of the extensional response provides an effective tool to control processing parameters as well as design complex fluids with required processability. A list of relevant applications and processes includes:

- Ink-jet printing
- Atomization
- Dispensing and dosing of complex fluids
- Electrospinning
- PSA
- Spray and curtain coating
- Fertilizer distribution

== See also ==
- Fluid thread breakup
- Plateau–Rayleigh instability
- Rheometer
- Visco-elastic jets
- Capillary action
- Capillary
