= Dynamic steering response =

Vehicle safety and advanced power steering system

Dynamic steering response (DSR) is a vehicle safety and advanced power steering system that can counteract unstable or difficult steering that may be caused by external forces such as strong crosswinds or uneven roads by giving proper steering assistance from the steering gear. DSR assists the driver by determining the correct steering ratio in a vehicle's power steering system to provide steering corrections to stabilize vehicles and increase safety. The system determines the steering ratio (the amount of turning of the steering wheel to the amount of turning of the vehicle’s wheels) based on factors such as current road conditions and vehicle speed. This system works by having an electric motor attached to the steering gear of a vehicle reducing or increasing the torque needed to steer based on the situation. Thus, less physical input from the driver is required creating a more comfortable driving experience overall.

DSR was first implemented in SEAT’s 2002 León Cupra R. But according to Acumen Research and Consulting, as of February 04, 2020, among the companies that have manufactured DSR systems, “the leading competitors are BMW, Ford Motor, Volvo, ZF-TRW, AUDI, Bosch, Denso Corporation, Danfoss, and Knorr-Bremse”. But DSR’s implementation is not limited to commercial cars as buses and industrial vehicles have taken advantage of the technology as well.

== Components ==
The main components of Dynamic Steering Response systems in automobiles are the control unit, sensors, and the electric motor. The control unit acts as the computer of the DSR unit and gives instructions to the electric motor. Instructions are determined by evaluating data from sensors to compute appropriate steering corrections. Sensors collect data such as current vehicle speed, turning angle, terrain conditions, crosswind acceleration, and torque applied to the steering wheel. The electric motor is a device powered by electricity that adds torque in the form of mechanical energy to a steering gear(the gear responsible for translating the rotation of the steering wheel to the actual turning of a vehicle). After calculating necessary steering corrections, the control unit instructs the electric motor to apply the torque needed to the vehicle's hydraulic steering gear. For the motor's control, it picks up the data at 2000 times a second (as in Volvo truck FM Series) based on the input from the driver, and from the on-board sensors. Its purpose is to provide precise steering control in every situation.

== Steering Correction in Certain Situations ==
The Dynamic Steering Response system can adapt to varying environments that would require steering assistance. Sensors constantly monitor road conditions and vehicle speed then relay this information to the control unit. The control unit’s instruction to the electric motor will differ based on the current environmental situations the vehicle faces.

=== Crosswind Stabilization ===
When a crosswind is detected, the DSR system’s sensors take in data such as crosswind acceleration(the force of a crosswind perpendicular to the vehicle), tire friction(the force between the tires and the surface preventing the tires from sliding), the inertia of the vehicle(the vehicle’s tendency to drive in a stable direction), and the current steering angle. Observed data such as driving behavior and offset steering bias is also taken into account. Driving behavior is determined through the accumulation of data over a longer period rather than the data that’s collected by sensors in real-time such as the data mentioned above. Offset steering bias is also determined over a longer period where the driver’s tendency to rotate the steering wheel off-center when driving straight is recorded. The control unit will utilize the data above to calculate the force of the crosswind acting on the vehicle's center of mass and determine the torque the electric motor should exert on the steering hydraulics to stiffen the steering wheel the proper amount.

=== Uneven Roads ===
The DSR system's sensors constantly monitor the conditions of the road to detect obstructions such as uneven pavement or potholes. If road conditions cause a vehicle to deviate from its path, DSR will correct its path by applying necessary torque to its steering column autonomously. Drivers do not have to stabilize the steering wheel by hand as DSR will counteract the vibrations of the steering wheel caused by uneven roads.

=== Fast/Slow Speeds ===
In situations where the vehicle is traveling at high speeds, the DSR system will tighten the steering wheel and lower the steering ratio to allow the vehicle to travel in a stable direction. The steering wheel will be set in place rather than having the driver hold the wheel tightly to prevent it from shaking. At lower speeds, the DSR system will increase the steering ratio by having the electric motor provide more assistance to the hydraulic steering system. Thus, less torque is needed to be applied to the steering wheel when making sharp turns. This makes the action of steering feel lighter and more controlled.

== Benefits ==
It increases the vehicle's maneuverability, making it more comfortable to drive. This takes away the physical effort of steering even at low speeds, regardless of how heavy the load is, by continuous feedback and sensing by the system. It improves the directional stability at high speeds, so that no small steering adjustments are needed. It diminishes the effect of road disturbances such as bumps and potholes, on the steering wheel at the cockpit. It detects the unwanted deviations in the wheels, with the electric servo motor balances it out.

Dynamic Steering Response systems reduce the torque required by drivers to make turns and stabilize their vehicles. In 2018, a study done by the International Journal of Occupational Safety and Ergonomics determined that dynamic steering reduced overall muscle activity on average by 15-25% when turning. They also reported a 68% reduction of muscle activity on steering maneuvers that required full ranges of motion from the drivers. Dynamic steering makes driving a more comfortable experience as pain and risk of injury from muscle activity is greatly reduced.

DSR systems also make driving more safer as vehicle stability and steering control is greatly improved. Obstacles on the road such as uneven grounds or potholes can cause unstable driving. But with DSR, vehicles now have greater directional stability counteracting the forces of uneven surfaces and potholes, reducing accidents. In addition to the reduction of driving fatigue, precise control of turns and stability at higher speeds ultimately increases safety with the implementation of DSR. The issue of possible electrical or sensor failure in DSR is also accounted for. In the case of this event, DSR is programmed to shut itself and the electric motor off to revert the vehicle back to hydraulic steering(steering without the assistance of DSR).
