= Digital Systems Resources =

Digital System Resources
- Type: Private
- Industry: Defense
- Founded: Manassas, Virginia (February 21, 1982)
- Headquarters: Fairfax, Virginia
- Key people: Richard Carroll, Chairman David Murray CEO
- Products: Multi-Purpose Processor; Signal Processing Software; Display Software; Combat Control Software
- Revenue: ▲$120 Million USD (2003)
- Number of employees: 450 (2003)
- Website: www.dsrnet.com (inactive)

Digital System Resources was a provider of advanced systems for the United States Department of Defense and became a success story for the military's SBIR program. From 1991 to 1997 it had been funded to the amount of $52,000,000, As of 2003 it was 75th on the Top 100 Federal Prime Contractors.

== Projects ==
- Acoustic Rapid COTS Insertion (A-RCI)
- Multi-Purpose Processor MPP
- SQQ-89 A(V)15
- Surface Ship CS (CNI)
- Photonics Mast Workstation
- SURTASS

== Financials ==
Digital System Resources had 2001 Revenues of ~$90 million according to Mr. Carrolls Testimony before Congress. Digital System Resources had 2003 Revenues of ~$120 million before being purchased by General Dynamics.

== History ==
Digital System Resources was started in 1982 with 2 employees. Its first contracts were with IBM's Manassas Virginia site. In 2001, DSR was successfully using the DoDs SBIR program and had grown to 170 employees. By 2003, DSR had grown to a company of over 450 employees. Digital System Resources was acquired by General Dynamics on September 10, 2003 for an undisclosed amount and merged with General Dynamics Advanced Information Systems.
