= Ranganathan Shashidhar =

Indian physicist (born 1946)

- Born: 1 January 1946 (age 80); Karnataka, India
- Education: University of Mysore
- Known for: Studies on Liquid crystals
- Awards: 1984 Shanti Swarup Bhatnagar Prize; 1999 Federal Laboratory Consortium Award; NRL Alan Berman Publication Award; NRL Edison Patent Award
- Scientific career
- Fields: Condensed matter physics
- Workplaces: University of Mysore; Raman Research Institute; Ruhr University Bochum; Massachusetts Institute of Technology; Georgetown University; AT&T Labs; Geo Centers; United States Naval Research Laboratory; Science Applications International Corporation; Polestar Technologies

Ranganathan Shashidhar (born 1 January 1946) is a US-based Indian condensed matter physicist and a former head of the Laboratory for Molecularly Engineered Materials and Surface of the Center for Biomolecular Science & Engineering, a division of the United States Naval Research Laboratory. Known for his research on liquid crystals, Shashidhar is an elected fellow of the Indian Academy of Sciences and the senior vice president of Polestar Technologies, a US-based company involved in the development of sensing technologies. The Council of Scientific and Industrial Research, the apex agency of the Government of India for scientific research, awarded him the Shanti Swarup Bhatnagar Prize for Science and Technology, one of the highest Indian science awards, for his contributions to Physical Sciences in 1984. (Note: Long link – please select award year to see details)

== Biography ==
University of Mysore

Born on 1 January 1946, Shashidhar did his college education at the University of Mysore from where he obtained bachelor's and master's degrees before securing a PhD from the same institution. Subsequently, he took up the position of a faculty member at his alma mater in 1971 and later, moved to Raman Research Institute as a scientist and professor. Before joining United States Naval Research Laboratory in 1993, he held various positions such as that of a visiting professor at Ruhr University Bochum (1983–87), Massachusetts Institute of Technology (1988–93) and Georgetown University, of a visiting scientist at AT&T Labs and of a senior scientist at Geo Centers Inc. He headed the Laboratory for Molecularly Engineered Materials and Surfaces at NRL. He has also been associated with Science Applications International Corporation (SAIC) and is a senior vice president of Polestar Technologies, leading their research and technology division.

Shashidhar studies modern condensed matter physics including reentrant polymorphism and multicritical points His studies in condensed matter physics include the subfield of liquid crystals and he has contributed to widening the understanding of their behavior at high temperatures, He led a team of scientists who developed a family of electroclinic liquid crystals with 256 greyscales and a fast enough response time, less than 100 microseconds, that allows their use in high resolution hand-held devices. He is also credited with the demonstration of the first fully multiplexed plastic display with 25,000 addressable pixels. His studies have been documented by way of a book, Liquid Crystal Materials Devices and Applications and a number of articles (Note: Please see Selected bibliography section) and the article repository of Indian Academy of Sciences has listed 40 of them. He holds patents for many processes (Note: For details, please see Patents section) and his work has drawn citations from other scientists. He is a former member of the board of directors of International Liquid Crystal Society, executive committee of International High Pressure Association and the editorial board of Liquid Crystals journal of Taylor & Francis.

== Awards and honors ==
The Council of Scientific and Industrial Research awarded him the Shanti Swarup Bhatnagar Prize, one of the highest Indian science awards in 1984. He was elected by the Indian Academy of Sciences as their fellow in 1988. In 1999, the team led by him received the Federal Laboratory Consortium Award for excellence in technology transfer. He is also a recipient of Alan Berman Publication Awards thrice and Edison Patent Award once, both awards given by the US Naval Research Laboratory.

== Selected bibliography ==
- R. Shashidhar (1994). Liquid Crystal Materials Devices and Applications. Photo Optical Society. p. 503. ISBN 978-9990069310.
- Long, D. P.; Lazorcik, J. L.; Shashidhar, R. (2004). "Magnetically directed self-assembly of carbon nanotube devices". Advanced Materials. 16 (9–10): 814–819. Bibcode:2004AdM....16..814L. doi:10.1002/adma.200306388. S2CID 135699476.
- Blum, Amy Szuchmacher; Kushmerick, James G.; Long, David P.; Patterson, Charles H.; Yang, John C.; Henderson, Jay C.; Yao, Yuxing; Tour, James M.; Shashidhar, Ranganathan; Ratna, Banahalli R. (2005). "Molecularly inherent voltage-controlled conductance switching". Nature Materials. 4 (2): 167–172. Bibcode:2005NatMa...4..167B. doi:10.1038/nmat1309. PMID 15654344. S2CID 10595987.
- Blum, Amy Szuchmacher; Soto, Carissa M.; Wilson, Charmaine D.; Brower, Tina L.; Pollack, Steven K.; Schull, Terence L.; Chatterji, Anju; Lin, Tianwei; Johnson, John E.; Amsinck, Christian; Franzon, Paul; Shashidhar, Ranganathan; Ratna, Banahalli R. (July 2005). "An engineered virus as a scaffold for three-dimensional self-assembly on the nanoscale". Small. 1 (7) (published 2005): 702–706. doi:10.1002/smll.200500021. PMID 17193509.
- Stapleton, Joshua J.; Daniel, Thomas A.; Uppili, Sundarajan; Cabarcos, Orlando M.; Naciri, Jawad; Shashidhar, Ranganathan; Allara, David L. (2005). "Self-assembly, characterization, and chemical stability of isocyanide-bound molecular wire monolayers on gold and palladium surfaces". Langmuir. 21 (24): 11061–11070. doi:10.1021/la051094z. PMID 16285772.
