= Jim Bachor =

American graphic designer

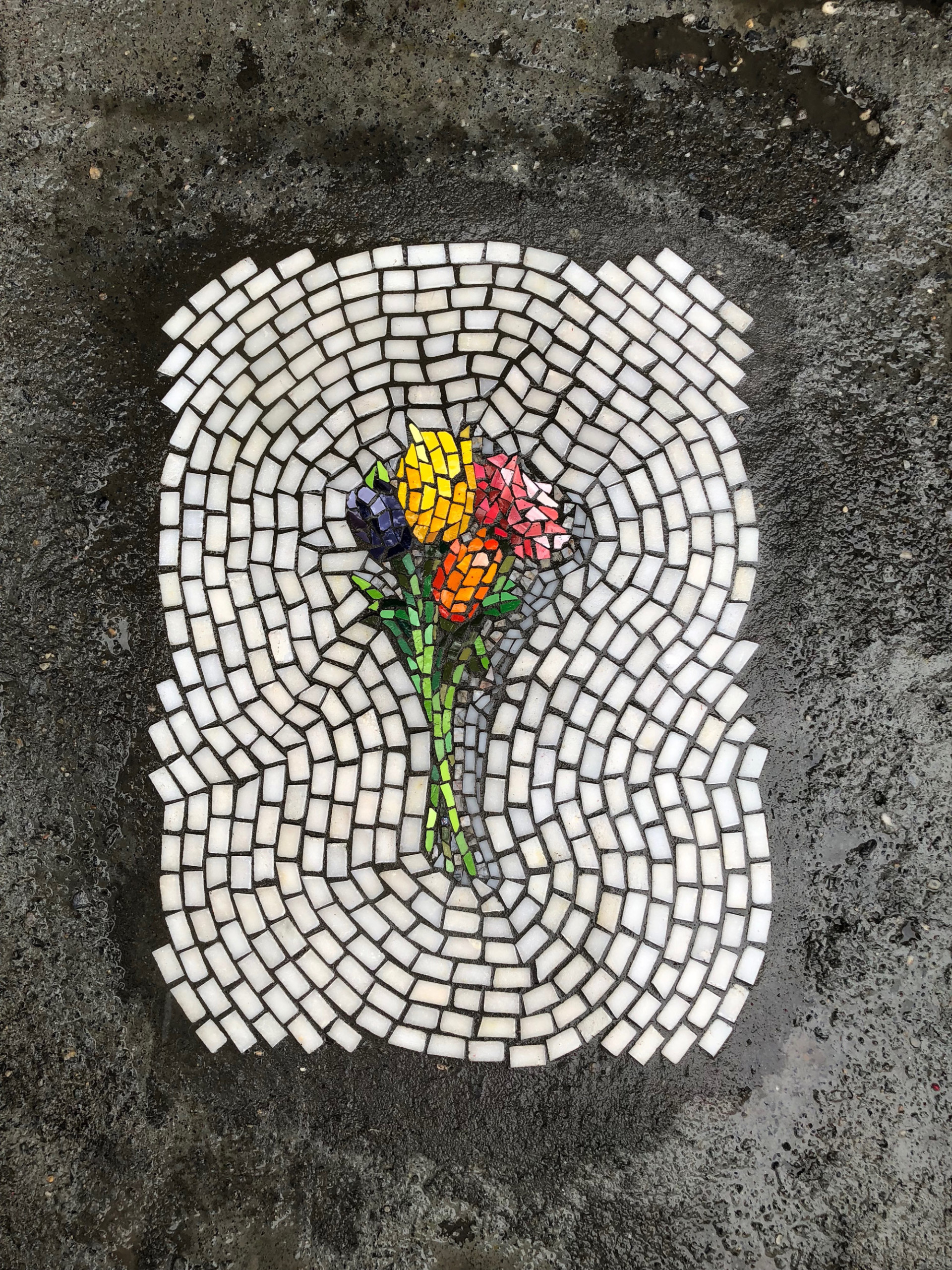

Jim Bachor (born c. 1964) is an American graphic designer, street and mosaic artist. He is known for his contemporary mosaics produced using ancient techniques. More recently, Bachor has become well known for the mosaic art that he has installed in potholes on the streets of Chicago, New York, Philadelphia, Detroit, San Antonio, Nashville, Los Angeles; Carrara, Italy; and Jyväskylä, Finland.

== Early life and education ==
Raised in suburban Detroit, Bachor pursued a pre-engineering program for two years at Michigan State University. He ultimately transferred to the Center for Creative Studies in downtown Detroit and graduated with a BFA in Graphic Design.

In the late 1990s, Bachor traveled to Ravenna, Italy, to study the ancient art of the mosaic.

== Career ==
He worked as an associate creative director at Chicago ad agency Foote, Cone & Belding.

After a visit to Pompeii, Italy, Bachor found mosaics that survived an ancient volcano and in 2013 he decided to begin filling potholes in Chicago with mosaics, with images such as a popsicle and flowers, and the message that it's "not a pothole anymore."

In the summer of 2014, Bachor completed Thrive, a 700-square-foot commission for the Chicago Transit Authority that was installed in the city's Thorndale Red Line "L" station. In the fall, he was commissioned to create an in-store 4 by 6 feet (1.2 by 1.8 m) floor mosaic at Nike's flagship store on North Michigan Avenue in Chicago.

In 2016, he installed several mosaics in Philadelphia, in collaboration with HAHA Magazine x Paradigm Gallery. One was entitled Make Your Mark. The same year, he installed a mosaic in front of the Spirit of Detroit statue on Woodward Avenue in Detroit.

In May 2017, he made his first political statement with a pothole mosaic in which the word "LIAR" was placed over an image of the Russian flag. It was installed on Wabash Avenue near Trump Tower in downtown Chicago. It was first made when Trump was sworn into office, and was installed during the period when it became known that Trump held a White House meeting with Russian diplomats in which he disclosed highly classified information.
