= Baadal Nanjundaswamy =

Indian painter

- Born: 2 February 1979 (age 47); Mysore
- Occupation: Artist
- Known for: Painting

Baadal Nanjundaswamy (Kannada: ಬಾದಲ್ ನಂಜುಂಡಸ್ವಾಮಿ) is an Indian painter. An alumnus of Chamarajendra Academy of Visual Arts (CAVA), he is most popular for his street art and 3D paintings. He lives in Bangalore.

== Early life ==
Baadal Nanjundaswamy (birth name: Baadal Nanjundaswamy Nanjaiah) was born in 1979 to Narasamma and Nanjaiah in the Kukkarahally area of Mysore district in the Indian state of Karnataka.

He was drawn to painting and literature in school. Even with limited sources of income, he acquired necessary education. To earn the fees for university education, he converted a petty shop bought on borrowed money into a painting workshop and sold his paintings. After graduation, Baadal worked with Ogilvy & Mather in their Bangalore office as a visualizer. He then worked freelance. He worked as an art director for Kannada films, plays, documentaries, short films and did design work for independent projects. U Turn (2016 film), Lucia, Lifeu Ishtene, Prakruthi and Police Quarter are notable works as an art director.

He has several Black and White portraits to his credit, including. Sachin Tendulkar’s portrait in the Students' Activity Center in IIT Bombay. Baadal wrote short stories in Kannada.

== Exhibitions ==
He crafted a series of sketches beginning in 2012 using colored gel pens. Forty such sketches drawn during train journeys were displayed at an exhibition titled 'Colors and beyond' in the Suchitra art gallery in 2012. The paintings are ‘slice-of-life’ scenes as observed by the artist. Another solo exhibition called ‘Machine Manushya’ was held in Sabarang art gallery, Mysore in September 2013. His paintings were part of other collective exhibitions. Besides the paintings, his installations in Kalamandira, Mysore depicted political and cultural themes.

== Street art ==
His most popular works are the street art that highlight the disorderly condition of roads in Bangalore and Mysore. Most went viral on social media. His work was appreciated for its satirical thought, quick execution and for influencing civic authorities.

- The model 'Crocodile installation' in a pothole on one of the roads in Sultanpalya in Bangalore in June 2015 led to its repair the next day.
- Painting Yama's face around an open manhole in June 2014 proved good for residents.
- He undertook work with seasonal themes during Christmas 2014, India's Independence day 2014, Deepavali 2014 and many other occasions.

== Recognition ==
- Gold medallist of the Bachelor of Fine Arts 2004 batch from Chamarajendra Academy of Visual Arts, affiliated to the University of Mysore
- Pride of Mysuru from Pragati Paratishtana (April 2015)
- President of the sub-committee of Handicrafts & fine arts by the Government of Karnataka (2014)
- 'Pride of workmanship' award from Rotary Club of Bangalore. "EXEMPLARS-2017".
- "Bengaluru Youth Award" is conferred to the Youth of Bengaluru in recognition of his outstanding achievement in February 2016.
- "Samartha Kannadiga" award from samartha kannadigaru, Kannada Sangha, Mysuru 2018.
