= Kalappa Muniyappa =

Indian molecular biologist and geneticist

- Born: 8 September 1952 (age 74); Karnataka, India
- Education: University of Mysore; Indian Institute of Science; University of Georgia; Yale University School of Medicine
- Known for: Molecular basis of homologous genetic recombination
- Awards: 1980 Hanumantha Rao Memorial Medal; 1992 Rockefeller Foundation Career Development Award; 1994 IISc M. Sreenivasaya Memorial Award; 1995 Shanti Swarup Bhatnagar Prize; 1995 ACS Eleanor Roosevelt Award; 1999 Yamagiwa International Cancer Fellowship Award; 2002 Anima Sen Memorial Award; 2007 IISc Alumni Award; 2007 BBMP Kempe Gowda Award
- Scientific career
- Fields: Molecular genetics; Functional genomics; Molecular cell biology
- Workplaces: Indian Institute of Science; American Cancer Society; University of Washington, Seattle; Osaka University; University of Sydney; Medical Research Council

Kalappa Muniyappa (born 8 September 1952) is an Indian molecular biologist and geneticist, known for his researches on the chromatization of DNA and gene targeting. He is a professor and chairman of the department of biochemistry of the Indian Institute of Science and an elected fellow of the Indian National Science Academy, Indian Academy of Sciences and the National Academy of Sciences, India. The Council of Scientific and Industrial Research, the apex agency of the Government of India for scientific research, awarded him the Shanti Swarup Bhatnagar Prize for Science and Technology, one of the highest Indian science awards, in 1995, for his contributions to biological sciences.

== Biography ==
Born on 2 February 1951 in the South Indian state of Karnataka, Kalappa Muniyappa, after graduating in science from Mysore University in 1974, secured his master's degree in 1976 from the same university with first rank. His doctoral degree came from the Indian Institute of Science in 1980 after which he did his post-doctoral studies (1981–86) at the University of Georgia and at Yale University School of Medicine and returned to India in 1987 to join the Indian Institute of Science the next year as a member of faculty. He was made a professor in 1999 and is the incumbent chairman of the department of biochemistry of IISc. In between, he held visiting professorships at American Cancer Society, University of Washington, Seattle, Osaka University, University of Sydney and the Medical Research Council, London.

== Legacy ==
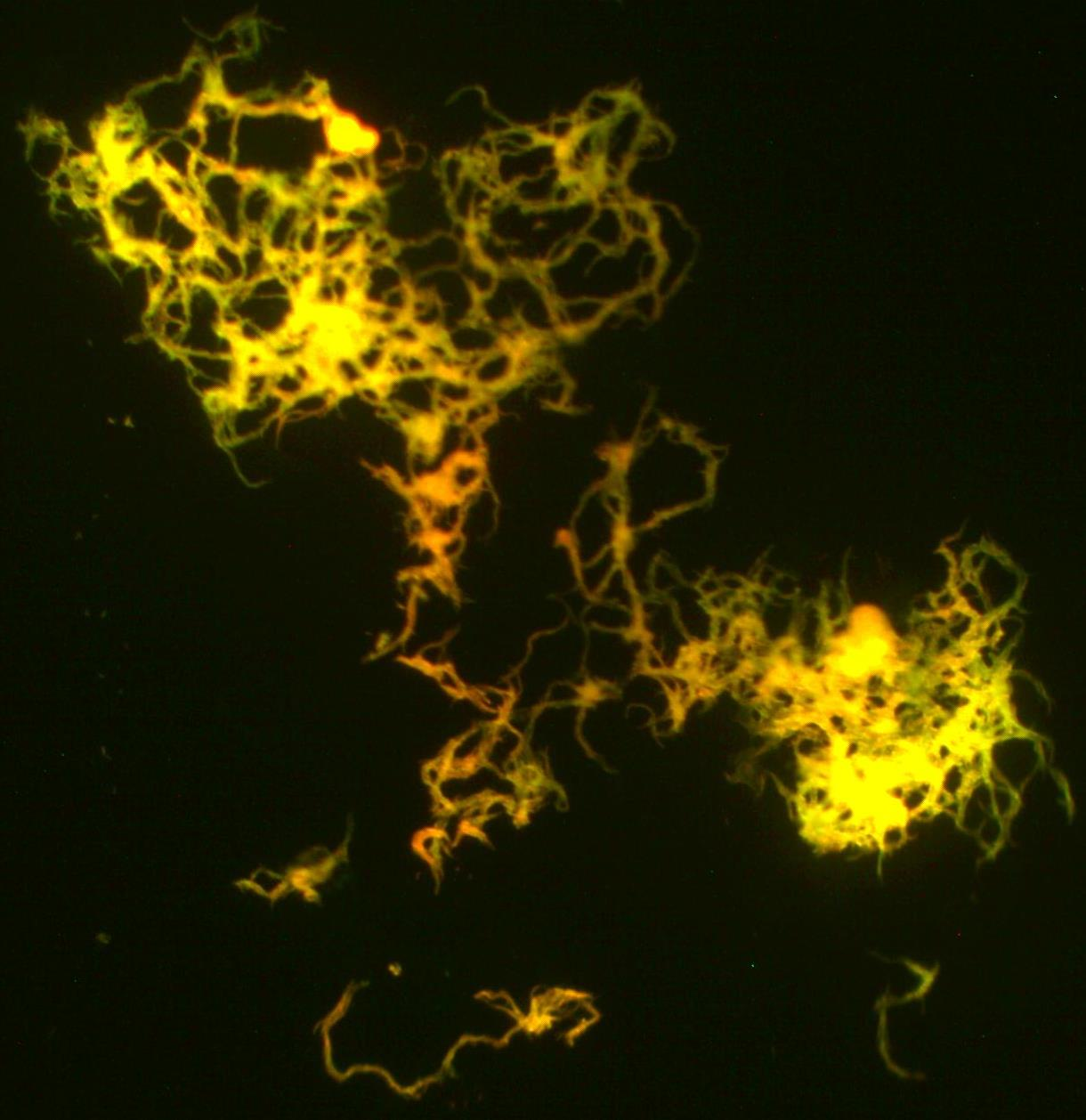
Chording mycobacterium tuberculosis culture - luminescent microscope image

Focusing his early researches on the molecular basis of homologous genetic recombination and employing RecA paradigm, Muniyappa demonstrated the effects of chromatization of DNA on homologous pairing and strand exchange and his studies are known to have assisted in exploring ways for gene targeting, cell senescence and genome stability. His studies on chromosome synapsis, genetic recombination and telomere dynamics attempted to widen the understanding of cellular recombination and Holliday junction and he is credited with the discovery of a negative regulatory mechanism of homologous recombination. His contributions in deciphering genetic recombination in mycobacterium tuberculosis are also reported to have influenced further researches on the mechanism of genetic exchange and lateral gene transfer. His researches have been published in a number of articles, 136 of which have been listed by ResearchGate, an online article repository.

At the Indian Institute of Science, he set up a laboratory, K. Muniyappa's Lab, to pursue researches in the fields of Cancer biology, Genetics, Biochemistry and Biophysics, where he mentors a number of doctoral and post-doctoral research scholars. Under his leadership, IISc introduced new academic programs such as the integrated PhD program, interdisciplinary program in chemical biology, and national post-doctoral training program in Biotechnology and Life Sciences. He served as their coordinator at inception.

A member of the editorial board of the Journal of Molecular Signaling, he has also been associated with Journal of Biosciences and Indian Journal of Biophysics and Biochemistry as their editorial board member and has served as the vice president and secretary of the Society of Biological Chemists.

== Awards and honors ==
Muniyappa received the Hanumantha Rao Memorial Medal of the IISc in 1980 and the Rockefeller Foundation Career Development Award in 1992. The Council of Scientific and Industrial Research awarded him the Shanti Swarup Bhatnagar Prize, one of the highest Indian science awards, in 1995. The same year, he received the M. Sreenivasaya Memorial Award of the Indian Institute of Science. The American Cancer Society extended the Eleanor Roosevelt Fellowship Award to him in 1995. He received the Yamagiwa International Cancer Fellowship Award in 1999. The Indian Science Congress Association selected him for the Anima Sen Memorial Award in 2002. In 2007 he received the Indian Institute of Science Alumnus Award and the Kempe Gowda Award of the Bruhat Bengaluru Mahanagara Palike (BBMP). He was given the Sir M. Visvesvaraya Award for lifetime contributions to Science & Technology by GoK, and the Karnataka Rajyotsava Award by GoK. A founder member of the Karnataka State Academy for Science and Technology, Muniyappa is an elected fellow of the Indian National Science Academy and the Indian Academy of Sciences. He was elected to The World Academy of Sciences (TWAS) and the National Academy of Sciences, India.

== See also ==
Prof. K. Muniyappa has been awarded G.N.R. Gold Medal for Excellence in Science & Technology (CSIR). Prof K. Muniyappa has been conferred the prestigious CSIR Bhatnagar Fellowship.
