= Dynamic shear rheometer =

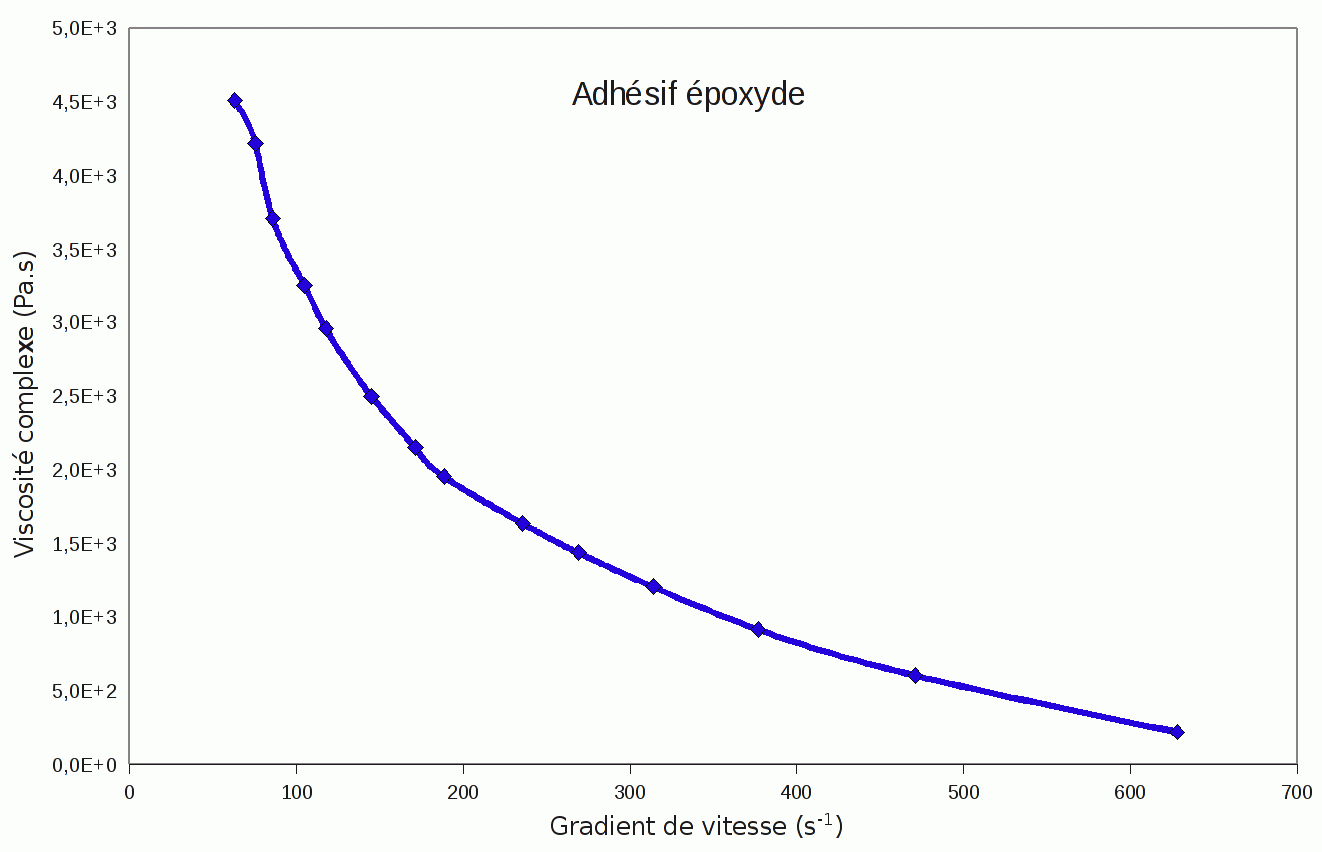
- Viscosity curve of epoxy-based sealer at 80 °C showing the shear thinning of the molten epoxy resin. Using a dynamic rheometer. Frequency: from 100 to 10 Hz (log variation). Plate/plate geometry - gap: 700 µm. Deformation: 0.01 %. The complex viscosity µ* (oscillation measurement) is comparable to the viscosity µ (rotation measurement). The velocity gradient is proportional to the frequency.
- Uses: Research and development as well as for quality control

A dynamic shear rheometer, commonly known as DSR, is used for research and development as well as for quality control in the manufacture of a wide range of materials. Dynamic shear rheometers have been used since 1993 when Superpave was used for characterising and understanding high temperature rheological properties of asphalt binders in both the molten and solid state and is fundamental in order formulate the chemistry and predict the end-use performance of these materials.

This is done by deriving the complex modulus (G*) from the storage modulus (elastic response, G') and loss modulus (viscous behaviour, G") yielding G* as a function of stress over strain. It is used to characterize the viscoelastic behavior of asphalt binders at intermediate temperatures from 10 to 150 °C (50 to 302 °F).
