= Johari–Goldstein relaxation =

Johari–Goldstein relaxation, also known as the JG β-relaxation, is a universal property of glasses and certain other disordered materials. Proposed in 1969 by Martin Goldstein, JG β-relaxation were described as a secondary relaxation mechanism required to explain the viscosity behavior of liquids approaching the glass transition in the potential energy landscape picture presented in Goldstein's seminal 1969 paper. Previous experiments on glass forming liquids showed multiple relaxation times present in liquids measured by time dependent compliance measurements. Gyan Johari and Martin Goldstein measured the dielectric loss spectrum of a set of rigid glass forming molecules to further test the hypothesis of Goldstein in 1969. The relaxation, a peak in mechanical or dielectric loss at a particular frequency, had previously been attributed to a type of molecular flexibility. The fact that such a loss peak shows up in glasses of rigid molecules lacking this flexibility demonstrated its universal character.

The JG β-relaxation process is speculated to be a precursor of the structural α-relaxation, i.e., its occurrence facilitates viscous flow, however the microscopic mechanism of the β-relaxation has not been definitively identified.

== Evidence for the universality and importance of the J. G. β-relaxation ==
Johari determined the temperature dependence of the α-relaxation and β-relaxation as a function of frequency by measuring the dielectric loss ε″ as a function of frequency at multiple temperatures. They observed two peaks in the system with the lower frequency peak attributed to the structural α-relaxation and the higher frequency peak related to the fast (high frequency short time) β-relaxation. The peak in the high frequency ε″ response of the β-relaxation has also been shown to broaden and shift to lower frequencies. Furthermore, the α-relaxation peak changes more rapidly on cooling than the rate of JG β-relaxation, where the α-relaxation times diverge following the VFT law as glass transition temperature (Tg) is approached which is much faster than the Arrhenius temperature dependence observed for the peak in the β-relaxation curve over the same temperature ranges.

== Relation to other relaxation mechanism ==
The J.G. β-relaxation was developed based on the theoretical predictions of Martin Goldstein in his seminal 1969 paper discussing the potential energy landscape picture and activated energy barrier hopping for viscous liquids. These developments have often focused on understanding secondary relaxations below Tg that are present in small molecule and metallic glasses. Polymer glasses also show multiple relaxation mechanisms at temperatures below Tg, with β, γ, and δ relaxations having been measured well below Tg into the glassy state. However, the exact molecular mechanism for these relaxations is often subject to debate and how they may relate to J. G β-relaxations is not established by the literature.
