= Viscotherm =

Viscotherms is a general name used to describe equipment for control of viscosity and temperature of a fluid, in particular of fuel oil in fuel viscosity control systems. The term originated from a brand name Viscotherm registered by VAF Instruments in 1971 and produced until 2009.

The first viscotherm used a measuring capillary and a small pump being fitted throughout the piping of the fluid flow system. The pump produced a constant pressure to force the measured liquid through the capillary. The viscosity was then determined by taking pressure readings a certain points off the capillary. The value of viscosity was then transferred to a PID controller to regulate the temperature of the fuel. This device allowed to measure the real time changes of viscosity and was heavily used in the maritime industry to optimize the combustion of the fuel oil in diesel engines.

After a fire at VAF’s premises in 2009 the Viscotherm was declared obsolete. It was replaced by the Viscosense, a new generation viscometer based on rotational vibrations of a pendulum in a liquid. However, VAF made sure that an easy to install retrofit for the Viscotherm, combining an identical shaped house and the Viscosense sensor, is available.

== See also ==
- Viscometer
- Fuel oil
- Fuel viscosity control
