= Reyn (disambiguation) =

Reyn may refer to

- The Rhine, a river in Europe
- Reyn, a unit of viscosity
- Reyn Ouwehand, Dutch record producer, multi-instrumentalist and composer
- Reyn, a character from Xenoblade Chronicles.

== See also ==
- Rhene
