= Flow cups =

Measuring device

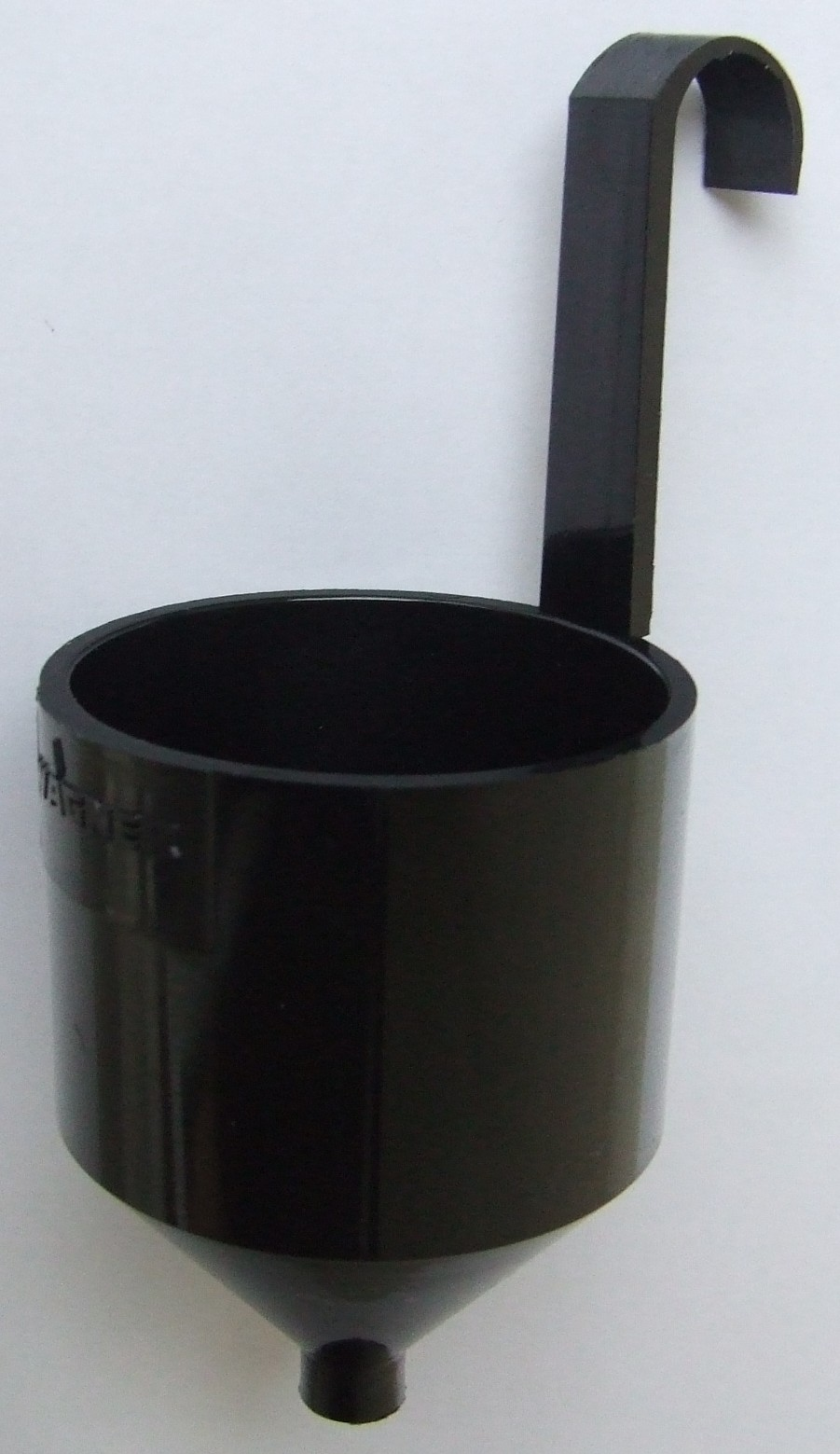

Flow cups are designed to accurately measure the viscosity of paints, inks, varnishes and similar products. The process of flow through an orifice can often be used as a relative measurement and classification of viscosity. This measured kinematic viscosity is generally expressed in seconds of flow time which can be converted into centistokes (cSt) using a viscosity calculator.

Flow cups are manufactured using high grade aluminium alloy with stainless steel orifices (where indicated), flow cups are available with a range of UKAS / ISO 17025 certified standard oils to confirm the flow cup is measuring within specification.

| Type | Orifice diameter | Viscosity range | Flow times |
|---|---|---|---|
| BS FLOW CUP; BS 3900 (1971) Old Specification (B2); BS 3900 (1971) Old Specification (B3); BS 3900 (1971) Old Specification (B4); BS 3900 (1971) Old Specification (B5); BS 3900 (1971) Old Specification (B6) | 2.38mm (0.09”); 3.17mm (0.12”); 3.97mm (0.16”); 4.76mm (0.19”); 7.14mm (0.28”) | 38 - 71cSt; 38 - 147cSt; 71 - 455cSt; 299 - 781cSt; 781 - 1650cSt | 30 - 300 secs |
| DIN FLOW CUP; Din Flow Cup (2mm) - Din 53211; Din Flow Cup (4mm) - Din 53211; Din Flow Cup (6mm) - Din 53211; Din Flow Cup (8mm) - Din 53211; The orifices are manufactured from stainless steel. | 2mm (0.08”); 4mm (0.16”); 6mm (0.24”); 8mm (0.31”) | 15 - 30cSt; 112 - 685cSt; 550 - 1500cSt; 1200 - 3000cSt (approximately) | 25 - 150 secs |
| FORD FLOW CUP; Ford Flow Cup No 1 - ASTM D1200; Ford Flow Cup No 2 - ASTM D1200; Ford Flow Cup No 3 - ASTM D1200; Ford Flow Cup No 4 - ASTM D1200; Ford Flow Cup No 5 - ASTM D1200; The orifices are manufactured from stainless steel. | 2.1mm (0.08”); 2.8mm (0.11”); 3.4mm (0.13”); 4.1mm (0.16”); 5.8mm (0.23”) | 10 - 35cSt; 25 - 120cSt; 49 - 220cSt; 70 - 370cSt; 200 - 1200cSt | 55 - 100 secs 40 - 100 secs 30 - 100 secs 30 - 100 secs 30 - 100 secs |
| ISO/ASTM FLOW CUP; Flow Cups to BS EN ISO 2431, ASTM D5125; Flow Cups to BS EN ISO 2431, ASTM D5125; Flow Cups to BS EN ISO 2431, ASTM D5125; Flow Cups to BS EN ISO 2431, ASTM D5125; Flow Cups to BS EN ISO 2431, ASTM D5125; The orifices are manufactured from stainless steel. | 3mm (0.12”); 4mm (0.16”); 5mm (0.20”); 6mm (0.24”); 8mm (0.31”) | 7 - 42cSt; 35 - 135cSt; 91 - 325cSt; 188 - 684cSt; 600 - 2000cSt | 30 - 100 secs |
| AFNOR FLOW CUP; Afnor Flow Cup - 2.5mm - NF T30-014; Afnor Flow Cup - 4mm - NF T30-014; Afnor Flow Cup - 6mm - NF T30-014; Afnor Flow Cup - 8mm - NF T30-014 | 2.5mm (0.10”); 4mm (0.16”); 6mm (0.24”); 8mm (0.31”) | 5 - 140cSt; 50 - 1100cSt; 510 - 5100cSt; 700 - 11500cSt | 30 - 100 secs |
| FRIKMAR FLOW CUP; Frikmar Flow Cup 2mm Frikmar Flow Cup 4mm Frikmar Flow Cup 6mm Frikmar Flow Cup 8mm The orifices are manufactured from stainless steel. | 2mm (0.08”); 4mm (0.16”); 6mm (0.24”); 8mm (0.31”) | 15 - 30 cSt; 112 - 685cSt; 550 - 1500cSt; 1200 - 3000cSt (approximately) | 25 - 150 secs |

== See also ==
- Flow measurement
- Viscometer
- Zahn cup
- Ford cup
