= Fuel viscosity control =

Fuel viscosity control is a technique to control viscosity and temperature of fuel oil (FO) for efficient combustion in diesel engines of motor vessels and generators of oil-fired power plants.

Fuel oil's viscosity strongly depends on the temperature, the higher is the temperature the lower is the viscosity. For optimal combustion the viscosity of the fuel should be in the range of 10–20 cSt. To maintain this value a combination of viscometer, PID controller and heater is used. Viscometer measures the actual viscosity of the fuel, this value is compared with the set point in the controller and the command is sent to the heater to adjust the temperature of the fuel.

== See also ==
- Diesel fuel
- Fuel oil
- Viscosity
- Viscometer
