= Gyan Johari =

British-Canadian engineering researcher

- Born: September 1, 1940; Rampur, India
- Died: January 28, 2024 (aged 83); Hamilton, Ontario, Canada
- Occupation: Theoretical Physicist
- Known for: Johari–Goldstein relaxation

Gyan P. Johari was a British-Canadian engineering researcher. He was a Professor Emeritus of Materials Science and Engineering at McMaster University. Johari is best known for his contributions to the state of liquids and the Johari–Goldstein relaxation.

== Career ==
While teaching in New York City, Johari collaborated with Martin Goldstein in studying the state of liquids. Together, they discovered a dynamical process in viscous liquids and in the glassy state of polar liquids. Their research into a universal property of glasses and certain other disordered materials was published as the Johari–Goldstein relaxation. After joining the faculty at McMaster University, Johari was elected a Fellow of the Royal Society of Canada in 1993. In 2007, Johari received an honorary degree from Trinity College Dublin.
