= Ford viscosity cup =

Viscosity measurement device

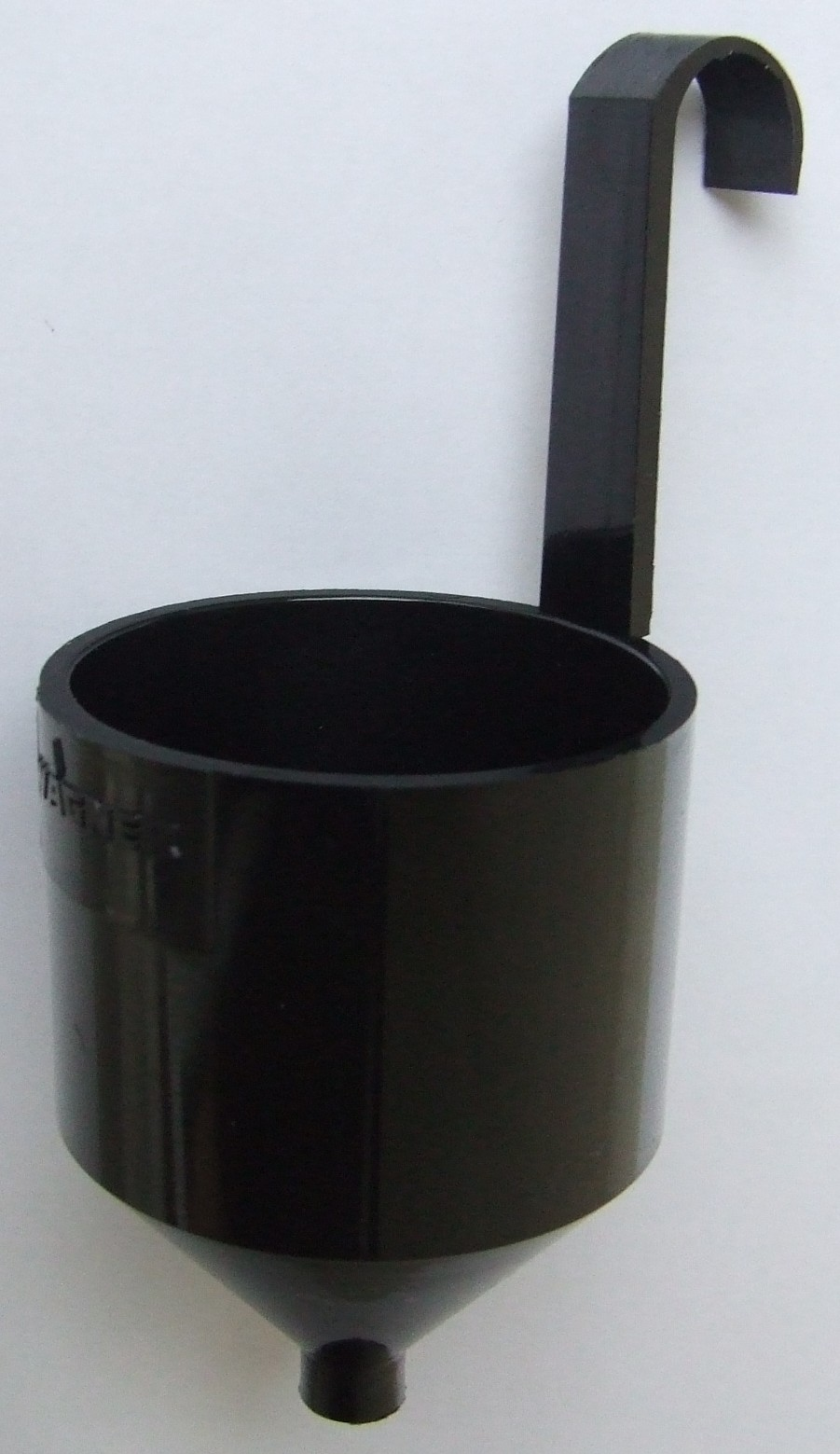
Ford viscosity cup 4 mm

The Ford viscosity cup is a simple gravity device that permits the timed flow of a known volume of liquid passing through an orifice located at the bottom. Under ideal conditions, this rate of flow would be proportional to the kinematic viscosity (expressed in stokes and centistokes) that is dependent upon the specific gravity of the draining liquid. However, the conditions in a simple flow cup are rarely ideal for making true measurements of viscosity. It is important when using a Ford Cup and when retesting liquids that the temperature of the cup and the liquid is maintained, as ambient temperature makes a significant difference to viscosity and thus flow rate.

Many other types of flow cups are used, depending on the industry or region:

- Din Cup 4 mm, standard DIN 53211 (cancelled)
- ISO Cup 2–6, 8 mm, standard ISO 2431
- AFNOR Cup 2, 4–6, 8 mm, standard NF T30-014
- ASTM Cup 1–5, standard ASTM D1200

== See also ==
- Flow cups
- Flow measurement
- Viscometer
- Zahn cup
