= Poiseuille (unit) =

Proposed SI derived unit of dynamic viscosity

poiseuille
- Unit of: viscosity
- Symbol: Pl
- Named after: Jean Léonard Marie Poiseuille
- Dimension: $\mathsf{M}\mathsf{L}^{-1}\mathsf{T}^{-1}$

Conversions
1 Pl in ...	... is equal to ...
- SI base units: 1 kg⋅m^{−1}⋅s^{−1}

The poiseuille (symbol Pl) has been proposed as a derived SI unit of dynamic viscosity, named after the French physicist Jean Léonard Marie Poiseuille (1797–1869).

In practice the unit has never been widely accepted and most international standards bodies do not include the poiseuille in their list of units. The third edition of the IUPAC Green Book, for example, lists Pa⋅s (pascal-second) as the SI-unit for dynamic viscosity, and does not mention the poiseuille.

The equivalent CGS unit, the poise, symbol P, is most widely used when reporting viscosity measurements.

$$1\  \text{Pl} = 1\ \text{Pa}{\cdot}\text{s} = 1 \text{kg}/\text{m}{{\cdot}}\text{s} = 1 \text{N}{\cdot}\text{s}/\text{m}^{2} = 10\ \text{dyn}{\cdot}\text{s}/\text{cm}^{2} = 10\ \text{P}$$

Liquid water has a viscosity of 0.000890 Pl at 25 °C (77 °F) at a pressure of 1 atm (0.000890 Pl = 0.00890 P = 0.890 cP = 0.890 mPa⋅s).

== Bibliography ==
- François Cardarelli (2004). Encyclopaedia of Scientific Units, Weights and Measures. Springer-Verlag London Ltd. ISBN 978-1852336820
