= Jean Léonard Marie Poiseuille =

French physicist and physiologist (1797–1869)

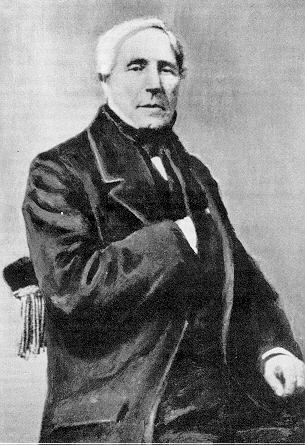
- Born: 22 April 1797; Paris, France
- Died: 26 December 1869 (aged 72); Paris, France
- Education: École Polytechnique
- Known for: Poiseuille's law
- Scientific career
- Fields: physicist and physiologist

Jean Léonard (Note: Some sources (including editions of Encyclopædia Britannica) give Poiseuille's full name as Jean Louis Marie Poiseuille. This appears to be a mistake, propagated from Larousse (1874).) Marie Poiseuille (Note: Pronunciation: UK: /pwæˈzɔɪ/ pwaz-OY, US: /pwɑːˈzɔɪ, pwɑːˈzwiː/ pwah-ZOY, pwah-ZWEE, French: [ʒɑ̃ leɔnaʁ maʁi pwazœj].) (22 April 1797 – 26 December 1869) was a French physicist and physiologist.

== Life ==
Poiseuille was born in and died in Paris. From 1815 to 1816, he studied at the École Polytechnique in Paris, where he was trained in physics and mathematics. In 1828, he earned his D.Sc. degree with a dissertation entitled Recherches sur la force du coeur aortique (The force of the aortic heart). He was interested in the flow of human blood in narrow tubes, and invented the U-tube mercury manometer (or hemodynamometer) to measure arterial blood pressures in horses and dogs.

In 1838, he experimentally derived, and in 1840 and 1846 formulated and published, Poiseuille's law (now commonly known as the Hagen–Poiseuille equation, crediting Gotthilf Hagen as well), which applies to laminar flow, that is, non-turbulent flow of liquids through pipes of uniform section, such as blood flow in capillaries and veins. The poise, the unit of viscosity in the CGS system, was named after him; a proposed SI unit for viscosity, the poiseuille, was also named in his honour.
