= Reyn =

British unit of dynamic viscosity

In fluid dynamics, the reyn is a British unit of dynamic viscosity, named in honour of Osbourne Reynolds, for whom the Reynolds number is also named.

== Conversions ==
By definition,

1 reyn = 1 lb_{f} s in^{−2}.

It follows that the relation between the reyn and the poise is approximately

1 reyn = 6.89476 × 10^{4} P.

In SI units, viscosity is expressed in newton-seconds per square meter, or equivalently in pascal-seconds. The conversion factor between the two is approximately

1 reyn = 6894.76 Pa s.
