= Poise (unit) =

Unit of dynamic viscosity in the CGS system of units

poise
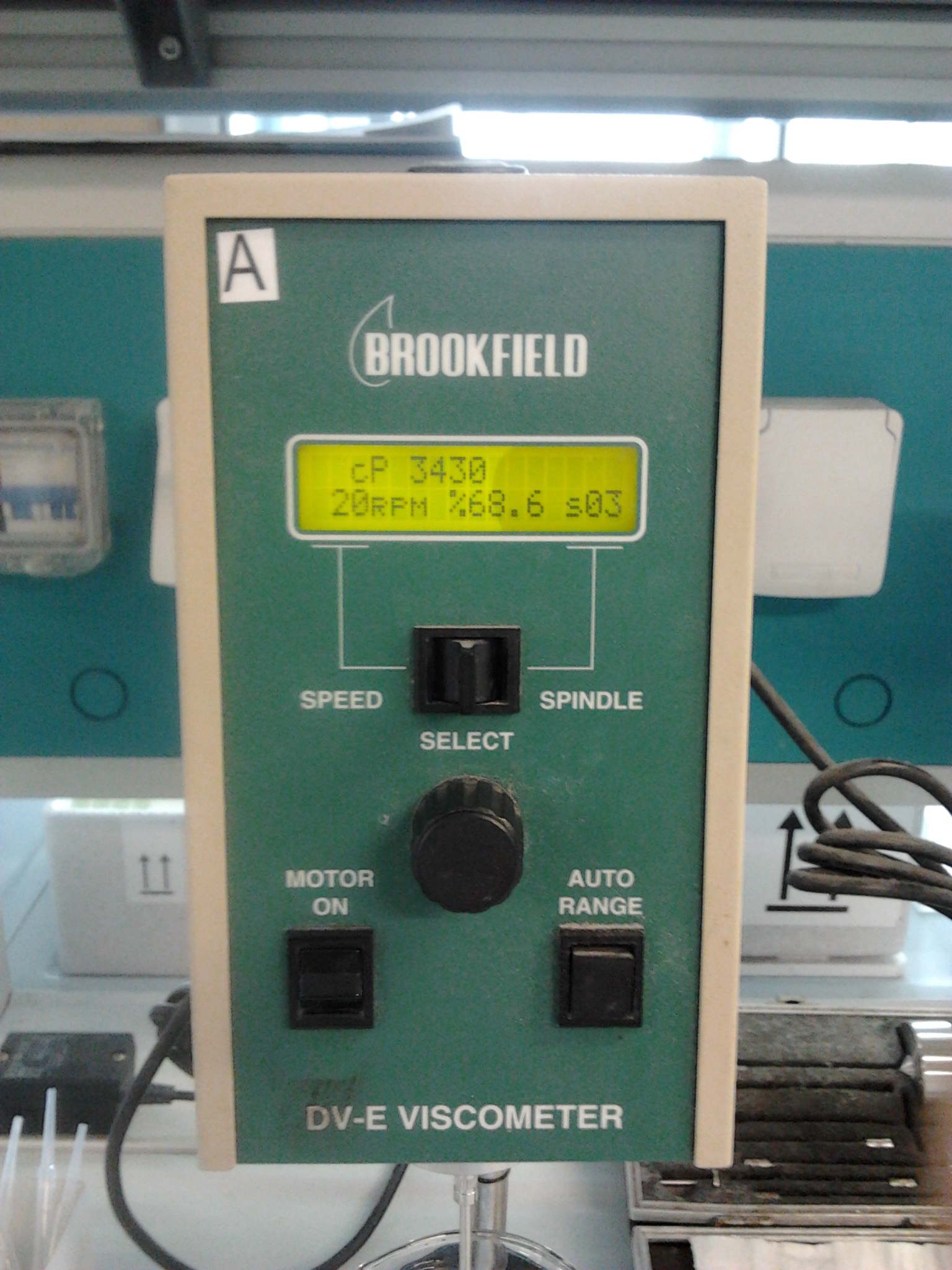
- Viscometer with viscosity given in centipoises (cP)

General information
- Unit system: Centimetre–gram–second system of units
- Unit of: Dynamic viscosity
- Symbol: P
- Named after: Jean Léonard Marie Poiseuille
- Derivation: 1 P = 1 dyn⋅s/cm^{2}

Conversions
1 P in ...	... is equal to ...
- CGS base units: 1 cm^{−1}⋅g⋅s^{−1}
- SI units: 0.1 Pa⋅s

The poise (symbol P; /pɔɪz, pwɑːz/) is the unit of dynamic viscosity (absolute viscosity) in the centimetre–gram–second system of units (CGS). It is named after Jean Léonard Marie Poiseuille (see Hagen–Poiseuille equation). The centipoise (1 cP = 0.01 P) is more commonly used than the poise itself.

Dynamic viscosity has dimensions of $\mathrm{force \times time/area}$, that is, $[\mathsf{M}^1 \mathsf{L}^{-1} \mathsf{T}^{-1}]$.

$$1~\text{P} = 0.1~\text{m}^{-1} {\cdot} \text{kg} {\cdot} \text{s}^{-1} = 1~\text{cm}^{-1} {\cdot} \text{g} {\cdot} \text{s}^{-1} = 1~\text{dyn} {\cdot} \text{s} {\cdot} \text{cm}^{-2}.$$

The analogous unit in the International System of Units is the pascal-second (Pa⋅s):

$$1~\text{Pa} {\cdot} \text{s} = 1~\text{N} {\cdot} \text{s} {\cdot} \text{m}^{-2} = 1~\text{m}^{-1} {\cdot} \text{kg} {\cdot} \text{s}^{-1} = 10~\text{P}.$$

The poise is often used with the metric prefix centi- because the viscosity of water at 20 °C (standard conditions for temperature and pressure) is almost exactly 1 centipoise. A centipoise is one hundredth of a poise, or one millipascal-second (mPa⋅s) in SI units (1 cP = 10^{−3} Pa⋅s = 1 mPa⋅s).

The CGS symbol for the centipoise is cP. The abbreviations cps, cp, and cPs are sometimes seen.

Liquid water has a viscosity of 0.00890 P at 25 °C at a pressure of 1 atmosphere (0.00890 P = 0.890 cP = 0.890 mPa⋅s).

== See also ==
- Poiseuille (unit)
- Viscosity
