= Saybolt universal viscosity =

Saybolt universal viscosity (SUV), and the related Saybolt FUROL viscosity (SFV), are specific standardised tests producing measures of kinematic viscosity. FUROL is an acronym for fuel and road oil. Saybolt universal viscosity is specified by the ASTM D2161. Both tests are considered obsolete to other measures of kinematic viscosity, but their results are quoted widely in technical literature.

In both tests, the time taken for 60 ml of the liquid, held at a specific temperature, to flow through a calibrated tube, is measured, using a Saybolt viscometer. The Saybolt universal viscosity test occurs at 100 °F (38 °C), or more recently, 40 °C (104 °F). The Saybolt FUROL viscosity test occurs at 120 °F (49 °C), or more recently, 50 °C (122 °F), and uses a larger calibrated tube. This provides for the testing of more viscous fluids, with the result being approximately 1/10 of the universal viscosity.

The test results are specified in seconds (s), more often than not referencing the test: Saybolt universal seconds (SUS); seconds, Saybolt universal (SSU); seconds, Saybolt universal viscosity (SSUV); and Saybolt FUROL seconds (SFS); seconds, Saybolt FUROL (SSF). The precise temperature at which the test is performed is often specified as well.
