= Michael Ojovan =

Moldovian-UK physical chemist

Michael I. Ojovan is a Moldovan-Russian-British physical chemist known for his contributions to glass science, vitrification, viscosity theory, and nuclear waste immobilisation. He has held academic and research positions in the United Kingdom, Russia, Japan, and China, and has worked extensively with the International Atomic Energy Agency (IAEA) on global nuclear waste management initiatives.

== Early life and education ==
Ojovan graduated with an MSc in Solid State Physics from the Moscow Engineering Physics Institute (now the National Research Nuclear University MEPhI) in 1979. He received a Ph.D. in 1982 for research on radiation interactions with small particles, followed by a DSc in Physical Chemistry in 1994 from the Moscow Scientific Research Institute of Physical Chemistry, focusing on surface effects in nuclear waste forms.

== Career ==
From 1982 to 2002, Ojovan served as deputy director of the Applied Research Centre of the Moscow Scientific and Industrial Association “Radon,” working on radioactive waste treatment and immobilisation technologies. He joined the University of Sheffield in 2002 as reader in waste immobilisation and later became associate professor in the School of Chemical, Materials and Biological Engineering. Between 2011 and 2024, he was professor of materials at Imperial College London, contributing to research on glass transition, viscosity models, and nuclear waste forms. Ojovan worked at the International Atomic Energy Agency (IAEA) from 2011 to 2018 as a nuclear waste management specialist. During this period, he founded and led several international programmes, including the International Predisposal Network (IPN), the IAEA Benchmarking System for Operational Waste from WWER Reactors, and the International Project on Irradiated Graphite Processing (GRAPA). He has also held senior scientific roles at Lomonosov Moscow State University and the Institute of Geology of Ore Deposits, Petrography, Mineralogy and Geochemistry (IGEM) of the Russian Academy of Sciences. In 2023, Ojovan was appointed guest professor at Wuhan University of Technology, and in 2024 was a visiting professor at the Tohoku University Advanced Institute for Materials Research.

== Research ==
Ojovan’s research covers vitrification, glass transition, viscosity models, radioactive waste immobilisation, and materials for nuclear applications. He has published extensively on glass structure, configuron theory, and the behaviour of nuclear waste forms. His work is widely cited in the fields of glass science and nuclear materials,.

== Editorial work ==
He is chief editor of Science and Technology of Nuclear Installations and serves as associate editor for the International Journal of Applied Glass Science, Frontiers in Nuclear Engineering, and Frontiers in Geochemistry. He is also a member of the editorial boards of Journal of Nuclear Materials, Sustainability, Materials, and npj Materials Degradation.

== Professional affiliations ==
Ojovan is a Fellow of the Russian Academy of Natural Sciences, elected in 1996.
