= Thickening agent =

Increases the viscosity of a liquid without altering its other properties

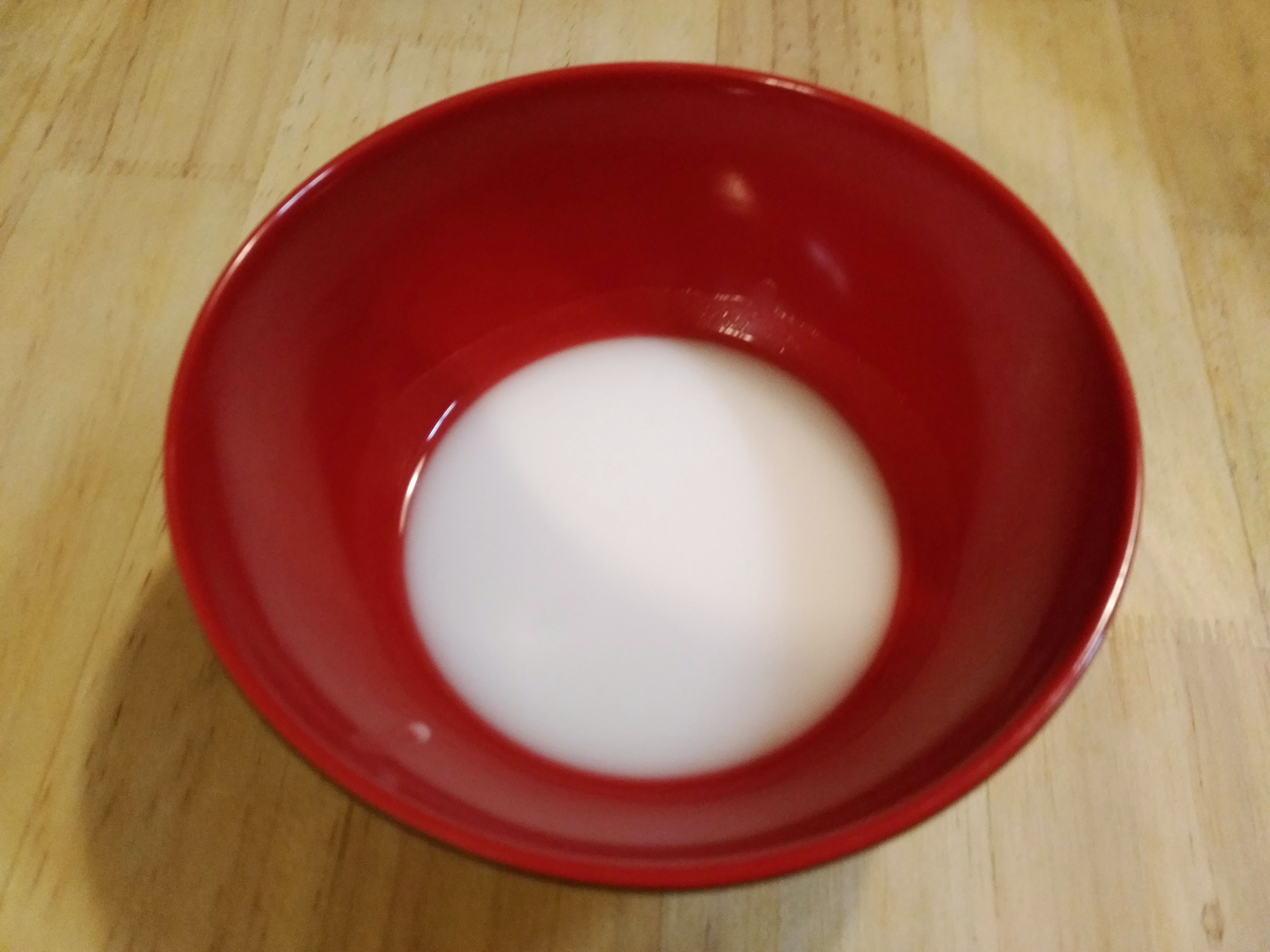
Potato starch slurry

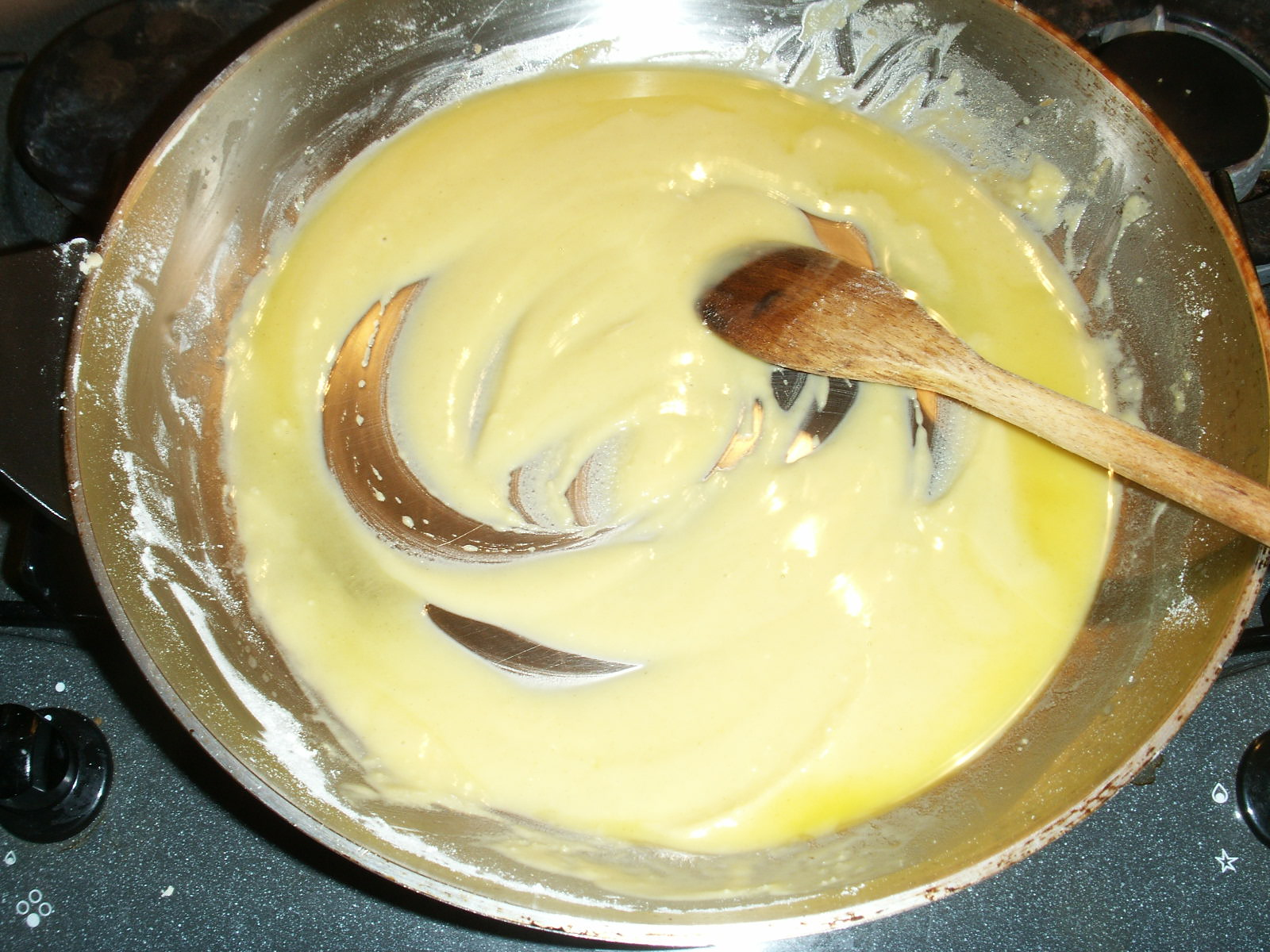
Roux

A thickening agent or thickener is a substance which can increase the viscosity of a liquid without substantially changing its other properties. Edible thickeners are commonly used to thicken sauces, soups, and puddings without altering their taste; thickeners are also used in paints, inks, explosives, and cosmetics.

Thickeners may also improve the suspension of other ingredients or emulsions which increases the stability of the product. Thickening agents are often regulated as food additives and as cosmetics and personal hygiene product ingredients. Some thickening agents are gelling agents (gellants), forming a gel, dissolving in the liquid phase as a colloid mixture that forms a weakly cohesive internal structure. Others act as mechanical thixotropic additives with discrete particles adhering or interlocking to resist strain.

Thickening agents can also be used when a medical condition such as dysphagia causes difficulty in swallowing. Some of these people may benefit from thickened fluids, but the benefits are limited.

Many other food ingredients are used as thickeners, usually in the final stages of preparation of specific foods. These thickeners have a flavor and are not markedly stable, thus are not suitable for general use. However, they are very convenient and effective, and hence are widely used.

Different thickeners may be more or less suitable in a given application, due to differences in taste, clarity, and their responses to chemical and physical conditions. For example, for acidic foods, arrowroot is a better choice than cornstarch, which loses thickening potency in acidic mixtures. At pH levels below 4.5, guar gum has sharply reduced aqueous solubility, thus also reducing its thickening capability. If the food is to be frozen, tapioca or arrowroot are preferable over cornstarch, which becomes spongy when frozen.

== Types ==
Food thickeners frequently are based on either polysaccharides (starches, vegetable gums, and pectin), or proteins.

=== Starches ===
This category includes starches as arrowroot, cornstarch, katakuri starch, potato starch, sago, wheat flour, almond flour, tapioca and their starch derivatives.

A flavorless powdered starch used for this purpose is a fecula (from the Latin faecula, diminutive of faex, "dregs").

=== Other polymers ===
Other sugar polymers include vegetable gums such as pectin from Citrus peel, guar gum from the guar bean, and locust bean gum from the carob bean.

Agar, alginin and carrageenan are polysaccharides extracted from algae, xanthan gum is a polysaccharide secreted by the bacterium Xanthomonas campestris, and carboxymethyl cellulose is a synthetic gum derived from cellulose. Proteins used as food thickeners include collagen, egg whites, and gelatin. Other thickening agents act on the proteins already present in a food; for example sodium pyrophosphate, which acts on casein in milk during the preparation of instant pudding.

=== Gelling agents ===
Gelling agents are food additives used to thicken and stabilize various foods, like jellies, desserts and candies. The agents provide the foods with texture through formation of a gel. Some stabilizers and thickening agents are gelling agents.

Typical gelling agents are based on polysaccharides such as natural gums, starches, pectins and agar-agar or proteins such as gelatin.

Examples are:

- Alginic acid (E400), sodium alginate (E401), potassium alginate (E402), ammonium alginate (E403), calcium alginate (E404) - polysaccharides from brown algae
- Agar (E406, a polysaccharide obtained from red algae)
- Carrageenan (E407, a polysaccharide obtained from red seaweeds)
- Locust bean gum (E410, a natural gum polysaccharide from the seeds of the carob tree)
- Pectin (E440, a polysaccharide obtained from apple or citrus-fruit)
- Gelatin (E441, made by partial hydrolysis of animal collagen)

Commercial jellies used in East Asian cuisines include the glucomannan polysaccharide gum used to make "lychee cups" from the konjac plants, and aiyu or ice jelly from the Ficus pumila climbing fig plant.

Agar-agar produces a very clear gel with light residual taste. Gelatin sheets disperse easily with no residual taste, but powdered form may have some taste. Kappa carrageenan may include potassium chloride to improve the gelling process and produces a clear product with very little aftertaste. Iota carrageenan contains sodium chloride which improves gel formation. Sodium alginate produces a medium viscosity gel but may have some aftertaste. High-methoxy pectin is one of the most widely used gelling agents in food processing. It reacts with some sugars and acids and sometimes includes minerals to improve gelling process. Low-methoxy pectin reacts with calcium, and is used for the preparation of low sugar jams.

=== Flours ===
Functional flours are produced from specific cereal variety (wheat, maize, rice or other) conjugated to specific heat treatment able to increase stability, consistency and general functionalities. These functional flours are resistant to industrial stresses such as acidic pH, sterilisation, freeze conditions, and can help food industries to formulate with natural ingredients. For the final consumer, these ingredients are more accepted because they are shown as "flour" in the ingredient list.

Flour is often used for thickening gravies, gumbos, and stews. The most basic type of thickening agent, flour blended with water to make a paste, is called whitewash. It must be cooked in thoroughly to avoid the taste of uncooked flour. Roux, a mixture of flour and fat (usually butter) cooked into a paste, is used for gravies, sauces and stews. Cereal grains (oatmeal, couscous, farina, etc.) are used to thicken soups. Yogurt is popular in Eastern Europe and Middle East for thickening soups. Soups can also be thickened by adding grated starchy vegetables before cooking, though these will add their own flavour. Tomato puree also adds thickness as well as flavour. Egg yolks are a traditional sauce thickener in professional cooking; they have rich flavor and offer a velvety smooth texture but achieve the desired thickening effect only in a narrow temperature range. Overheating easily ruins such a sauce, which can make egg yolk difficult to use as a thickener for amateur cooks. Other thickeners used by cooks are nuts (including rehan) or glaces made of meat or fish.

== In cooking ==
Many thickening agents require extra care in cooking. Some starches lose their thickening quality when cooked for too long or at too high a temperature; on the other hand, cooking starches too short or not hot enough might lead to an unpleasant starchy taste or cause water to seep out of the finished product after cooling. Also, higher viscosity causes foods to burn more easily during cooking. As an alternative to adding more thickener, recipes may call for reduction of the food's water content by lengthy simmering. When cooking, it is generally better to add thickener cautiously; if over-thickened, more water may be added but loss of flavour and texture may result.

Food thickening can be important for people facing medical issues with chewing or swallowing, as foods with a thicker consistency can reduce the chances of choking, or of inhalation of liquids or food particles, which can lead to aspiration pneumonia.

== Mechanical and thixotropic agents ==
Fumed silica and similar products form stiff microscopic chains or fibers which interlock or agglomerate into a mass, holding the associated liquid by surface tension, but which can separate or slide when sufficient force is applied. This causes the thixotropic or shear-thinning property (also frequently exhibited by gels), where the viscosity is non-Newtonian and becomes lower as the shearing force or time increases; their usefulness is primarily that the resulting increase in viscosity is large compared to the quantity of silica added. Fumed silica is generally accepted as safe as a food additive and is frequently used in cosmetics. Additives such as precipitated silica, fine talc, or chalk also meet the definition of thickening agent in that they increase viscosity and body while not affecting the target property of a mixture.

== Cosmetics ==
Thickening agents used in cosmetics or personal hygiene products include viscous liquids such as polyethylene glycol, synthetic polymers such as carbomer (a trade name for polyacrylic acid) and vegetable gums. Some thickening agents may also function as stabilizers when they are used to maintain the stability of an emulsion. Some emollients, such as petroleum jelly and various waxes may also function as thickening agents in an emulsion.

== Paint and printing thickeners ==
One of the main use of thickeners is in the paint and printing industries, which depend heavily on rheology modifiers, to prevent pigments settling to the bottom of the can, yielding inconsistent results. Water based formulas would be nearly impossible with the exception of India ink and the few other water-soluble pigments, but these would have very little coverage and at best would stain wood slightly. All modern paints and inks will have some pigment added at the factory for opacity and to control the specularity of the finish, from matte to high gloss, dependent on thickener used, but more so on the size of the particles added as opacity modifier. Particle sizes of 1 μm and below will be the limit of high gloss, probably confined to luxury automotive coatings, and about 100 μm particulates will make a bumpy surface on the microscopic scale, which scatters light and makes the surface appear matte.

Rheology modifiers in common use:

- Polyurethanes, acrylic polymers, latex, styrene/butadiene,
- PVA - polyvinyl alcohol, not polyvinylacetate which is used in adhesives such as wood glue. PVA monomers are dispersed in the paint or ink liquid at an early stage in the mix, as it does not affect rheology unless the pH is low. Boric acid is usually used to initiate polymerization after the pigment is added (the pigment "grind" stage) and dispersed, the mixture is thickened while stirring to maintain homogeneous consistency. Often this stage is problematic since air is entrained by all but the lowest shear impellers, which are inadequate for this purpose, instead antifoam additives are used to control air bubbles, which continue to be a benefit during paint application. Air entrainment during mixing is not unique to PVA—in fact hardly a formula for paint exists that doesn't at least require some care in mixing.
- Clays - attapulgite which also disperses suspensions, bentonite (both flocculating and non-flocculating), and other montmorillonite clays. Usually clays, when dry, exist as a very fine powder, facilitating dispersion and compatibility with other ingredients. Clays generally make matte surfaces, in spite of their fine particulate nature. Not only paints and inks, but other industries such as pharmaceutical, construction, and cosmetics, especially hair styling aids and facial detoxifying masks increasingly favor bentonite and attapulgite clays over other rheology modifiers, dispersion aids, opacifying fillers, antifoam, and numerous niche uses which exploit the numerous inherent qualities which have drawn artisans to this material. Clays are sustainably sourced and do not involve any egregious environmental damage, which were among the cheapest bulk materials until recently, when the pricing went up steadily, following the upsurge in its use pattern.
- Cellulosics - CMC, HMC, HPMC, and others, are chemically substituted cellulose macromolecules. The hydroxyl groups are substituted by other functional groups, such as methyl or propyl. The amount of substitution and molecular weight determine viscosity of the solution, assuming concentration stays the same; adding more also increases viscosity.
- Sulfonates - Sodium or calcium salts, good water retention, versatile, and highly efficient.
- Gums - guar, xanthan, cellulose, locust bean, and acacia are the main ones.
- Saccharides - carrageenan, pullulan, konjac, and alginate, sometimes called hydrocolloids, these thickeners are extremely versatile and specific in function—each has a series of grades or types which behave differently, for example kappa carrageenan will form strong gels (potassium activated) but iota carrageenan will not form gels and only thickens.
- Proteins - Casein, collagen, and sometimes albumin.
- Modified castor oil - much like cellulose, castor oil has hydroxyl groups, unlike other oils which at most have double bonds, which castor oil also has, but most substitutions occur at the hydroxyl moieties, allowing exotic derivatives with myriad properties. The most recent advances in rheology modifiers have been in this category. The BASF corporation has a new line based on castor oil derivatives, for example.
- Organosilicones - Silicone resins, dimethicones, and modified silicones simplify formulation somewhat, a borrowing from cosmetics.

All of the above rheology modifiers are used in the 0.2% to 2.0% range

== Petrochemistry ==
In petrochemistry, gelling agents, also called solidifiers, are chemicals capable of reacting with oil spills and forming rubber-like solids. The gelled coagulated oil then can be removed from the water surface by skimming, suction devices, or nets. Calm or only moderately rough sea is required.

== Flame fuel thickening compounds ==
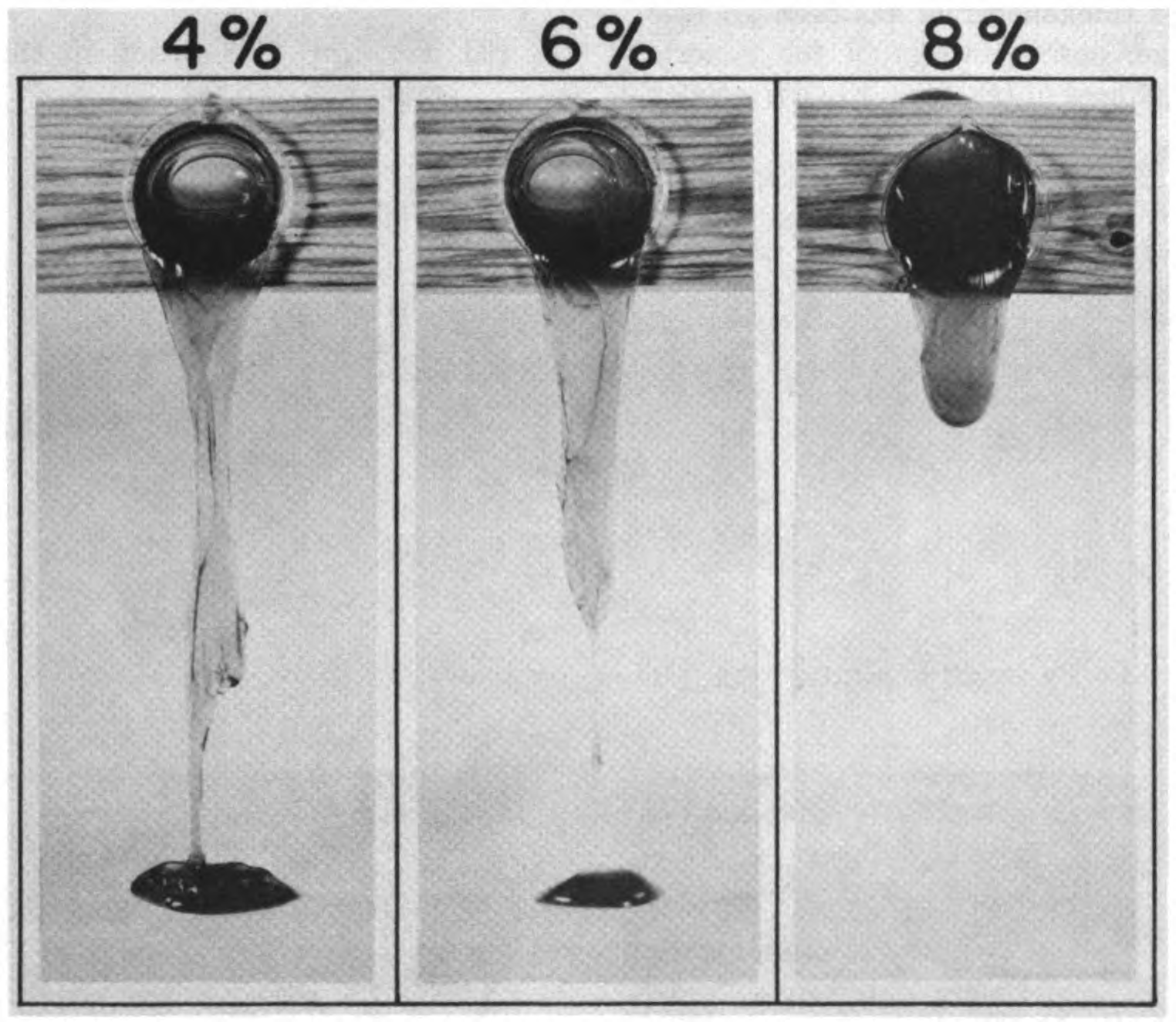
Napalm gel concentration and rheology - Napalm thickener is an impure hydroxyaluminum di-soap.

Many fuels used in incendiary devices require thickening for increased performance. Aluminium salts of fatty acids are frequently used. Some formulations (e.g. Napalm-B) use polymeric thickeners. Thickened pyrophoric agent, a pyrophoric replacement of napalm, is a triethylaluminium thickened with polyisobutylene.

Fuel thickeners are mostly composed of the same thickeners as polar liquids (water), due to the fact that they are amphiphile, that is, they have a polar and an apolar group. The only change is in the orientation of these groups. In the non-polar medium reverse micelle formation occurs.

Because the hydrocarbon-hydrocarbon type intermolecular interactions are the weakest, the reverse micelle is much more unstable than the normal micelle. The main gelled fuel precursors are commonly derived from weak acids and strong or weak bases.

- Calcium acetate - their coordination complexes
- Poly(alkyl methacrylate) - especially poly(isobutyl methacrylate)
- Polystyrene
- Aluminum oxide - (some grades)
- Paraffin wax
- Aluminum alcoholate (ISO-series)
- Silicon dioxide (some grades)
- Natural rubber (LA-series)
- tetraoxyborate - their coordination complexes
- Casein
- Sulfur (polysulfides)
- Polybutadiene
- Asphalt - and other organic minerals
- Bentonite clay (lyophilic type)
- Colloidal metal
- Metallic soaps - especially hydroxyaluminum soaps
- Cellulose derivatives
- Metal alkyls - especially dialkyl hydroxygallium and trialkyltin fluorides
- Carbomer
- Alginate

== See also ==
- Mucilage
- Paint thinner
- Polyelectrolyte
- Shear thickening
- Shear thinning
