= D3O =

Impact-protection equipment company

D3O is the namesake ingredient brand of British company D3O Lab, specializing in rate-sensitive impact protection technologies based on dilatant materials, also known as viscoelastic or shear thickening materials.

The brand focuses on designing and adding materials, including foams, and elastomers in both set and formable designs to various products to improve their flexibility, durability, or impact-protection compared to unarmored, hard-armored, or foam-armored products.

D3O is sold in multiple countries, it is used in sports and motorcycle gear, protective cases for consumer electronics, industrial workwear, and military protection, including helmet pads and limb protectors. Competitors also producing viscoelastic armor pads include RHEON, SAS-TEC, Knox MicroLock and TF impact armor.

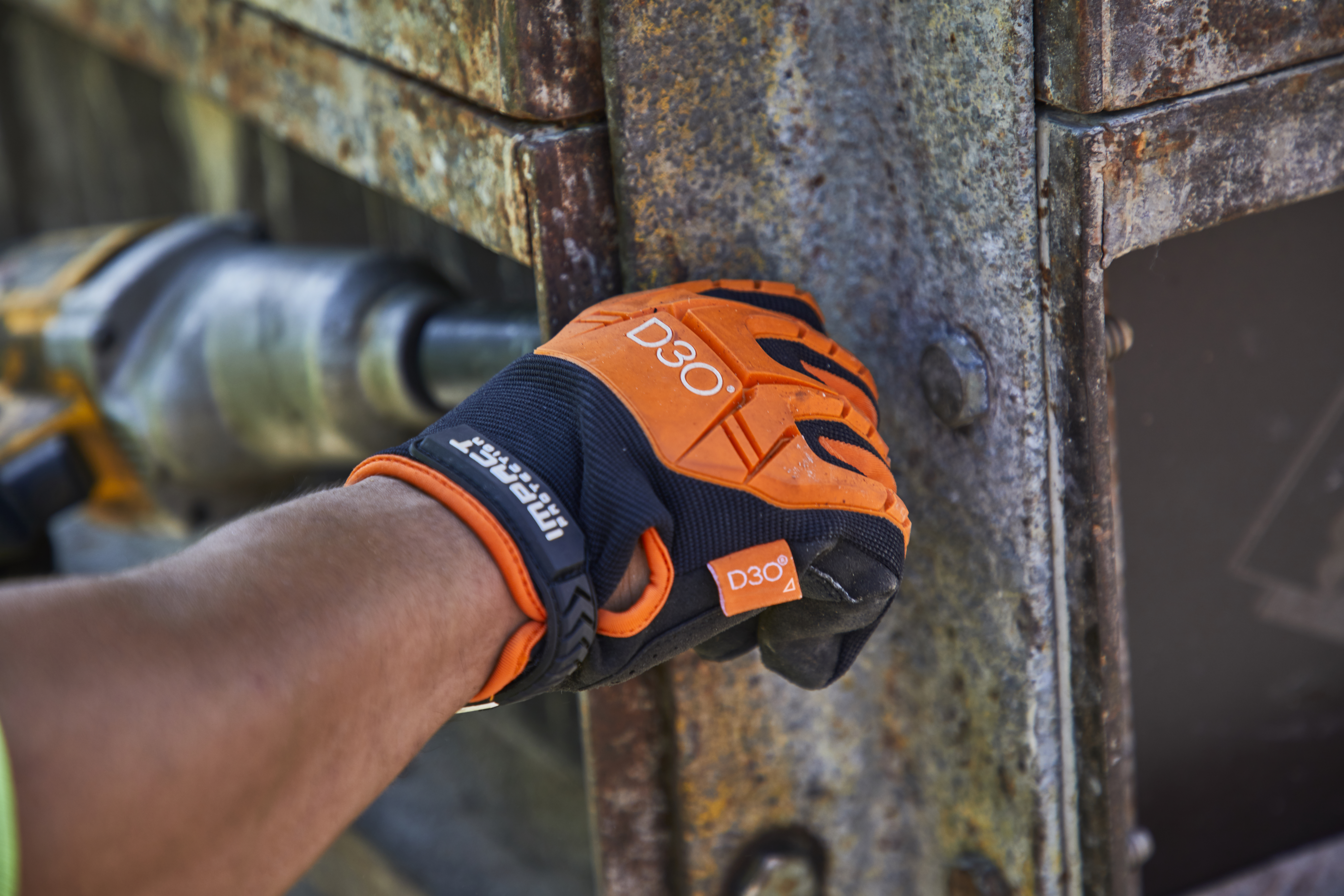
An example of D3O hand protection

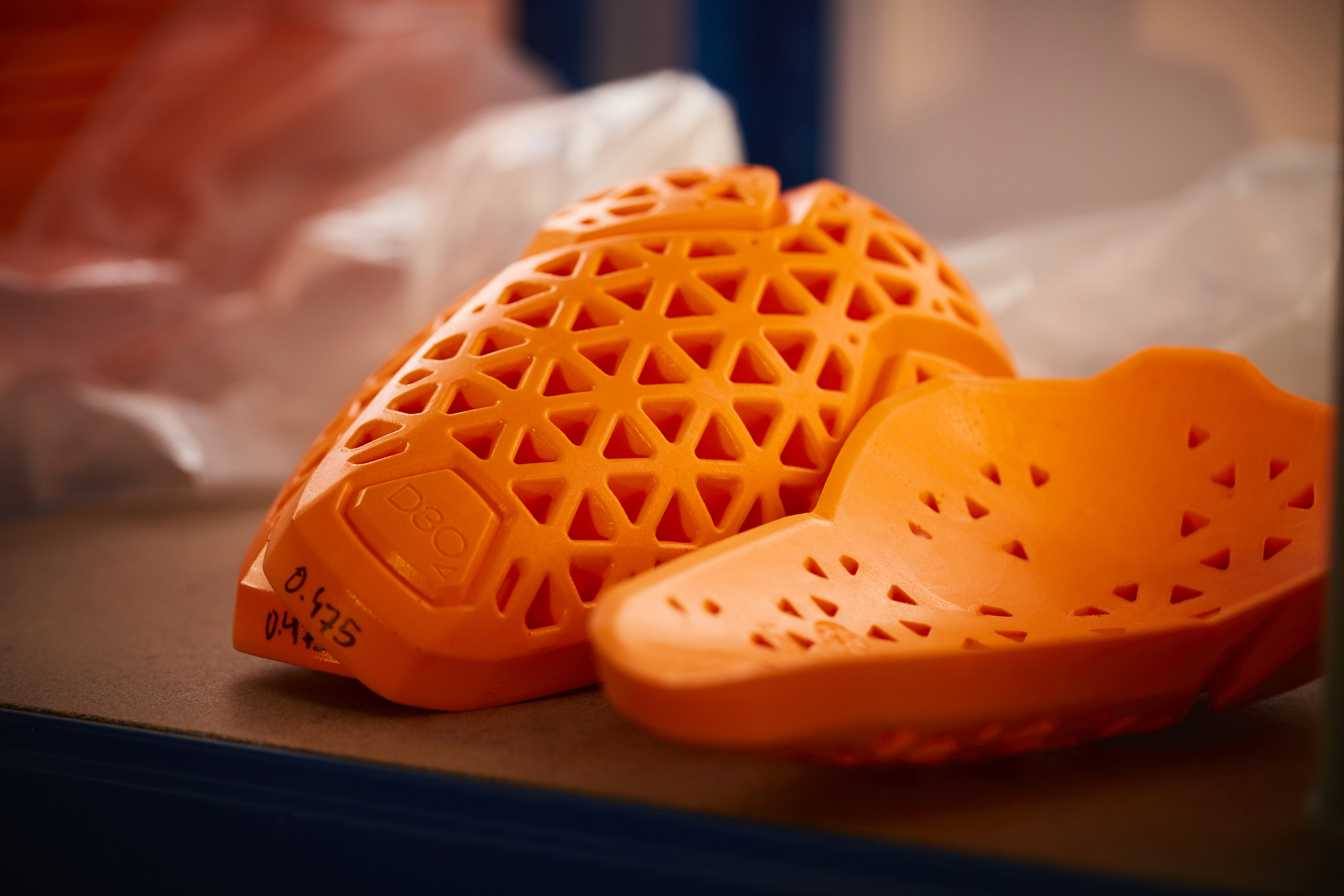
An example of a D3O limb protector

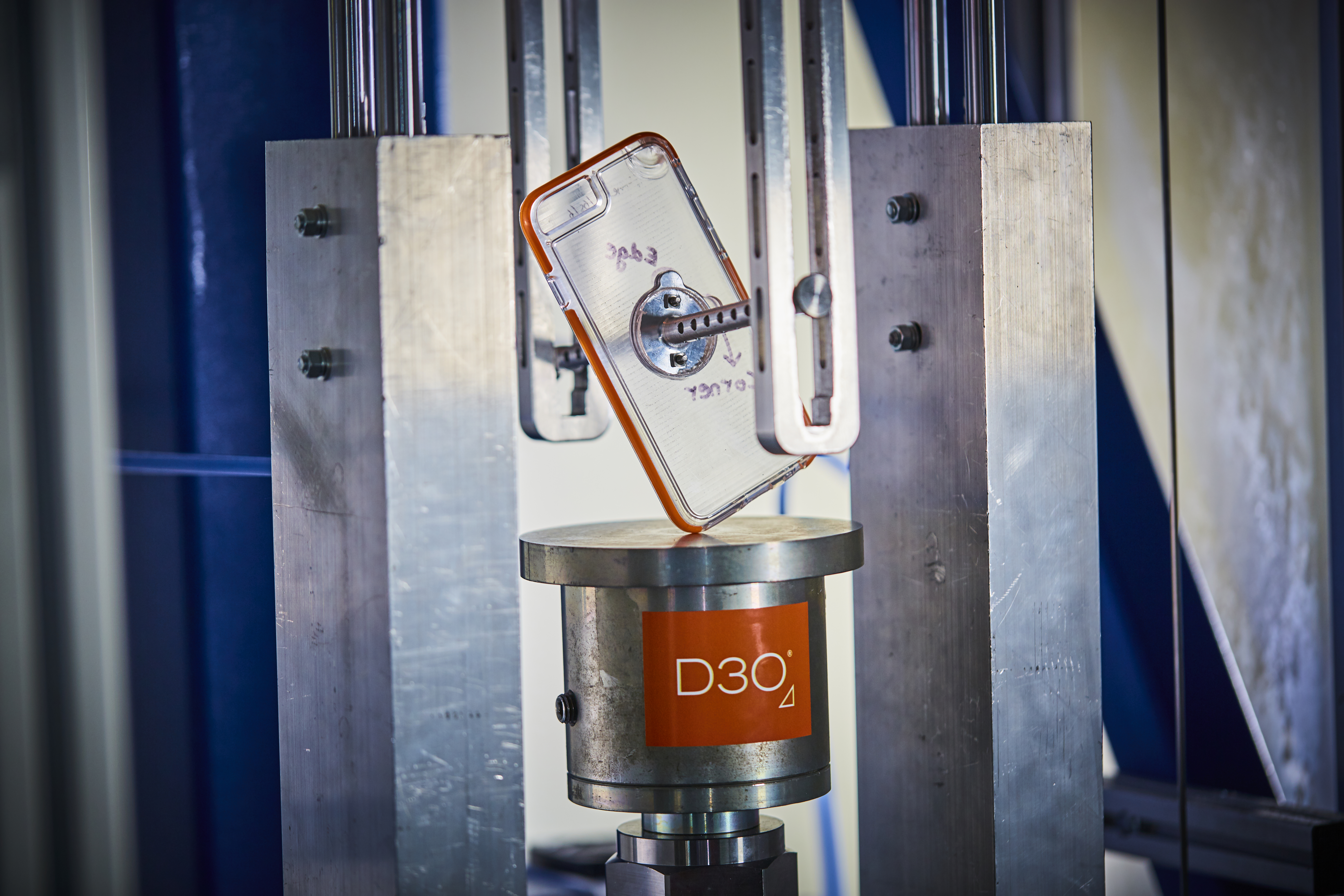
The D3O testing laboratory

== History ==
In 1999, the materials scientists Richard Palmer and Philip Green experimented with a dilatant non-Newtonian fluid. The fluid was free-flowing at rest but became instantly hard upon impact.

Palmer and Green drew inspiration from snowboarding and decided to replicate its matrix-like quality to develop a flexible material that incorporated the dilatant fluid. After experimenting with numerous materials and formulas, they invented a flexible, pliable material that locked together and solidified in the event of a collision.

When incorporated into clothing, the material moves with the wearer while providing protection similar to rigid armor and superior to foam armor when hit.

In 1999, A patent application was filed.

D3O was used commercially for the first time by the United States Ski Team and the Canadian ski team at the 2006 Olympic Winter Games. D3O first entered the motorcycle market in 2009 when the ingredient was incorporated into CE-certified armour for the apparel brand Firstgear.

Philip Green left D3O in 2006. In 2009 Stuart Sawyer became interim CEO. Palmer took a sabbatical in 2010 and left the business in 2011, handing over full executive control to Sawyer. In April 2026 it was announced that Sawyer was retiring, and Matthieu Bazil was announced as CEO. Sawyer remains on the D3O Board as a Non-Executive Director.

In 2014, D3O was awarded £237,000 by the Technology Strategy Board—now known as Innovate UK—to develop a shock absorption helmet system prototype for the defence market to reduce the risk of traumatic brain injury.

in 2015, the private equity & venture capital investor Beringea invested and D3O shifted towards product development and international marketing. D3O opened headquarters in London, which include test laboratories and house its global business functions.

The company began focusing more on the North American market and set up a new base of operations in the Virginia Tech Corporate Research Center (VTCRC) in Blacksburg, Virginia. Phone case manufacturer and business partner Gear4 became the UK’s number 1 phone case brand in volume and value.

In 2017, D3O became part of the American National Standards Institute (ANSI)/International Safety Equipment Association (ISEA) committee which developed the first standard in North America for protecting hands from impact injuries: ANSI/ISEA 138-2019

D3O was acquired in September 2021 by independent private equity fund Elysian Capital III LP from the previous owners, Beringea US & UK and Entrepreneurs Fund.

== D3O applications ==
D3O is used in electronics (impact protection for phones, laptops, and other electronic devices), sports equipment, motorcycle riding gear, defense (helmets, armor, footwear) and industrial workwear (personal protective equipment such as gloves, knee pads and metatarsal guards for boots).

In 2020, D3O suppiled helmet suspension pads for the US Armed Forces' Integrated Helmet Protection System (IHPS).

== Product development ==
D3O uses its patents to create consumer goods and partner with various companies and government agencies.

In-house laboratories check that D3O products meet CE standards for sports and motorcycle applications, ISEA 138 for industrial applications, and the requirements of militaries and police forces.

== Sponsorship ==
D3O sponsors athletes including:

- Downhill mountain bike rider Tahnée Seagrave
- Seth Jones, ice hockey defenseman and alternate captain for the Columbus Blue Jackets in the NHL
- Motorcycle racer Michael Dunlop, 36-times winner of the Isle of Man TT motorcycle race
- The Troy Lee Designs team of athletes including three-times Red Bull Rampage winner Brandon Semenuk
- Enduro rider Rémy Absalon, 12-times Megavalanche winner.

== Awards and recognition ==
D3O has received the following awards and recognition:

- 2014: Queen’s Award for Enterprise
- 2016: Inclusion in the Sunday Times Tech Track 100 ‘Ones to Watch’ list
- 2017: T3 Awards together with Three: Best Mobile Accessory
- 2018: British Yachting Awards – clothing innovation
- 2019: ISPO Award – LP2 Pro
- 2020: Red Dot - Snickers Ergo Craftsmen Kneepads
- 2022/2023: ISPO Textrends Award - Accessories & Trim
- 2023: IF Design Award - D3O Ghost Reactiv Body Protection
- 2023: ISPO Award – D3O Ghost back protector
