= Dilatant =

Material in which viscosity increases with the rate of shear strain

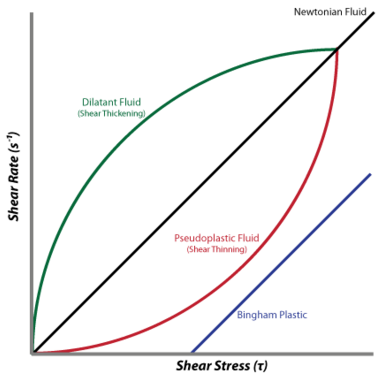
Plot of shear rate as a function of the shear stress. Dilatants in green.

A dilatant (/daɪˈleɪtənt/, /dɪ-/) (also termed shear thickening) material is one in which viscosity increases with the rate of shear strain. Such a shear thickening fluid, also known by the initialism STF, is an example of a non-Newtonian fluid. This behaviour is usually not observed in pure materials, but can occur in suspensions.

A dilatant is a non-Newtonian fluid where the shear viscosity increases with applied shear stress. This behavior is only one type of deviation from Newton's law of viscosity, and it is controlled by such factors as particle size, shape, and distribution. The properties of these suspensions depend on Hamaker theory and Van der Waals forces and can be stabilized electrostatically or sterically. Shear thickening behavior occurs when a colloidal suspension transitions from a stable state to a state of flocculation. A large portion of the properties of these systems are due to the surface chemistry of particles in dispersion, known as colloids.

This can readily be seen with a mixture of cornstarch and water (sometimes called oobleck), which acts in counterintuitive ways when struck or thrown against a surface. Sand that is completely soaked with water also behaves as a dilatant material — this is the reason why when walking on wet sand, a dry area appears directly underfoot.

Rheopecty is a similar property in which viscosity increases with cumulative stress or agitation over time. The opposite of a dilatant material is a pseudoplastic.

== Definitions ==
There are two types of deviation from Newton's law that are observed in real systems. The most common deviation is shear thinning behavior, where the viscosity of the system decreases as the shear rate is increased. The second deviation is shear thickening behavior where, as the shear rate is increased, the viscosity of the system also increases. This behavior is observed because the system crystallizes under stress and behaves more like a solid than a solution. Thus, the viscosity of a shear-thickening fluid is dependent on the shear rate. The presence of suspended particles often affects the viscosity of a solution. In fact, with the right particles, even a Newtonian fluid can exhibit non-Newtonian behavior. An example of this is cornstarch in water and is included in § Examples below.

The parameters that control shear thickening behavior are: particle size and particle size distribution, particle volume fraction, particle shape, particle-particle interaction, continuous phase viscosity, and the type, rate, and time of deformation. In addition to these parameters, all shear thickening fluids are stabilized suspensions and have a volume fraction of solid that is relatively high.

Viscosity of a solution as a function of shear rate is given by the power-law equation,
$$\eta = K \dot{\gamma}^{n - 1},$$
where η is the viscosity, K is a material-based constant, and γ̇ is the applied shear rate.

Dilatant behavior occurs when n is greater than 1.

Below is a table of viscosity values for some common materials.

Material	Viscosity (cP)
Benzene	0.60
Carbon tetrachloride	0.88
Water	1
Ethanol	1.06
Mercury	1.55
Pentane	2.24
Blood	10
Antifreeze	14
Sulfuric acid	27
Maple syrup	150–200
Honey	2,000–3,000
Chocolate syrup	10,000–25,000
Ketchup	50,000–70,000
Peanut butter	150,000–250,000

=== Stabilized suspensions ===
A suspension is composed of a fine, particulate phase dispersed throughout a differing, heterogeneous phase. Shear-thickening behavior is observed in systems with a solid, particulate phase dispersed within a liquid phase. These solutions are different from a Colloid in that they are unstable; the solid particles in dispersion are sufficiently large for sedimentation, causing them to eventually settle. Whereas the solids dispersed within a colloid are smaller and will not settle. There are multiple methods for stabilizing suspensions, including electrostatics and sterics.

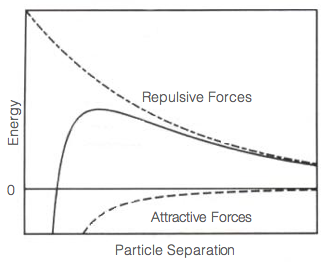
Energy of repulsion as a function of particle separation

In an unstable suspension, the dispersed, particulate phase will come out of solution in response to forces acting upon the particles, such as gravity or Hamaker attraction. The magnitude of the effect these forces have on pulling the particulate phase out of solution is proportional to the size of the particulates; for a large particulate, the gravitational forces are greater than the particle-particle interactions, whereas the opposite is true for small particulates. Shear thickening behavior is typically observed in suspensions of small, solid particulates, indicating that the particle-particle Hamaker attraction is the dominant force. Therefore, stabilizing a suspension is dependent upon introducing a counteractive repulsive force.

Hamaker theory describes the attraction between bodies, such as particulates. It was realized that the explanation of Van der Waals forces could be upscaled from explaining the interaction between two molecules with induced dipoles to macro-scale bodies by summing all the intermolecular forces between the bodies. Similar to Van der Waals forces, Hamaker theory describes the magnitude of the particle-particle interaction as inversely proportional to the square of the distance. Therefore, many stabilized suspensions incorporate a long-range repulsive force that is dominant over Hamaker attraction when the interacting bodies are at a sufficient distance, effectively preventing the bodies from approaching one another. However, at short distances, the Hamaker attraction dominates, causing the particulates to coagulate and fall out of solution. Two common long-range forces used in stabilizing suspensions are electrostatics and sterics.

==== Electrostatically stabilized suspensions ====
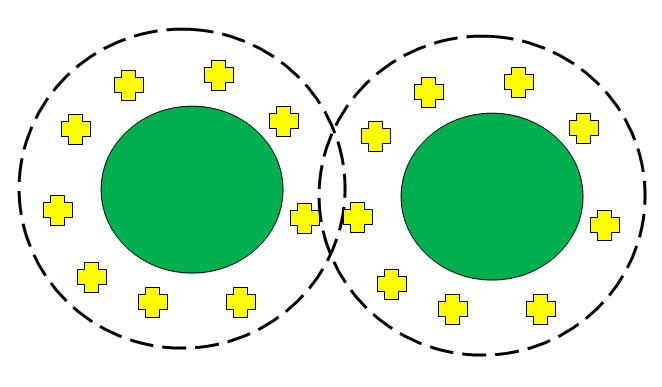
Particle in solution stabilized via the electrostatic double-layer force

Suspensions of similarly charged particles dispersed in a liquid electrolyte are stabilized through an effect described by the Helmholtz double layer model. The model has two layers. The first layer is the charged surface of the particle, which creates an electrostatic field that affects the ions in the electrolyte. In response, the ions create a diffuse layer of equal and opposite charge, effectively rendering the surface charge neutral. However, the diffuse layer creates a potential surrounding the particle that differs from the bulk electrolyte.

The diffuse layer serves as the long-range force for stabilization of the particles. When particles near one another, the diffuse layer of one particle overlaps with that of the other particle, generating a repulsive force. The following equation provides the energy between two colloids as a result of the Hamaker interactions and electrostatic repulsion.

$$V = \pi R\left(\frac{-H}{12\pi h^2} + \frac{64 C k_\text{B} T \Gamma^2 e^\kappa h}{\kappa^2}\right),$$
where:

- V, energy between a pair of colloids,
- R, radius of colloids,
- −H, Hamaker constant between colloid and solvent,
- h, distance between colloids,
- C, surface ion concentration,
- k_{B}, Boltzmann constant,
- T, temperature in kelvins,
- $\Gamma,$ surface excess,
- $\kappa,$ inverse Debye length.

==== Sterically stabilized suspensions ====
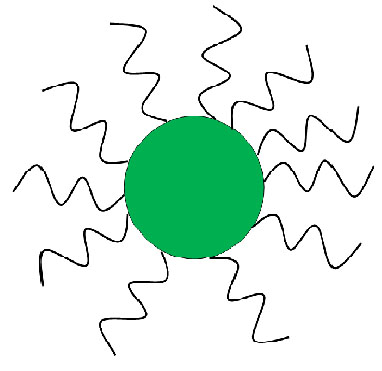
Particle in suspension stabilized via steric hindrance

Different from electrostatics, sterically stabilized suspensions rely on the physical interaction of polymer chains attached to the surface of the particles to keep the suspension stabilized; the adsorbed polymer chains act as a spacer to keep the suspended particles separated at a sufficient distance to prevent the Hamaker attraction from dominating and pulling the particles out of suspension. The polymers are typically either grafted or adsorbed onto the surface of the particle. With grafted polymers, the backbone of the polymer chain is covalently bonded to the particle surface. Whereas an adsorbed polymer is a copolymer composed of lyophobic and lyophilic region, where the lyophobic region non-covalently adheres to the particle surface and the lyophilic region forms the steric boundary or spacer.

== Theories behind shear thickening behavior ==
Dilatancy in a colloid, or its ability to order in the presence of shear forces, is dependent on the ratio of interparticle forces. As long as interparticle forces such as Van der Waals forces dominate, the suspended particles remain in ordered layers. However, once shear forces dominate, particles enter a state of flocculation and are no longer held in suspension; they begin to behave like a solid. When the shear forces are removed, the particles spread apart and once again form a stable suspension.

Shear thickening behavior is highly dependent upon the volume fraction of solid particulate suspended within the liquid. The higher the volume fraction, the less shear required to initiate the shear thickening behavior. The shear rate at which the fluid transitions from a Newtonian flow to a shear thickening behavior is known as the critical shear rate.

=== Order to disorder transition ===
When shearing a concentrated stabilized solution at a relatively low shear rate, the repulsive particle-particle interactions keep the particles in an ordered, layered, equilibrium structure. However, at shear rates elevated above the critical shear rate, the shear forces pushing the particles together overcome the repulsive particle-particle interactions, forcing the particles out of their equilibrium positions. This leads to a disordered structure, causing an increase in viscosity.

The critical shear rate here is defined as the shear rate at which the shear forces pushing the particles together are equivalent to the repulsive particle interactions.

=== Hydroclustering ===
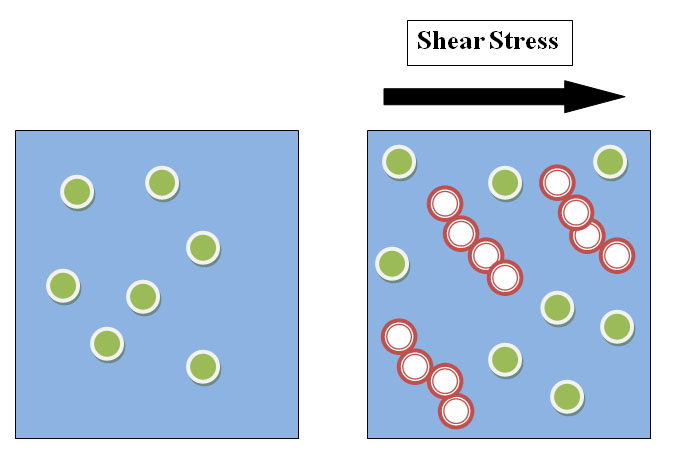
Transient hydroclustering of particles in a solution

When the particles of a stabilized suspension transition from an immobile state to mobile state, small groupings of particles form hydroclusters, increasing the viscosity. These hydroclusters are composed of particles momentarily compressed together, forming an irregular, rod-like chain of particles akin to a logjam or traffic jam. In theory the particles have extremely small interparticle gaps, rendering this momentary, transient hydrocluster as incompressible. It is possible that additional hydroclusters will form through aggregation.

== Examples ==
=== Corn starch and water (oobleck) ===
Cornstarch is a common thickening agent used in cooking. It is also a very good example of a shear-thickening system. When a force is applied to a 1:1.25 mixture of water and cornstarch, the mixture acts as a solid and resists the force.

=== Silica and polyethylene glycol ===
Silica nano-particles are dispersed in a solution of polyethylene glycol. The silica particles provide a high-strength material when flocculation occurs. This allows it to be used in applications such as liquid body armor and brake pads.

== Applications ==
=== Traction control ===
Dilatant materials have certain industrial uses due to their shear-thickening behavior. For example, some all-wheel drive systems use a viscous coupling unit full of dilatant fluid to provide power transfer between front and rear wheels. On high-traction road surfacing, the relative motion between primary and secondary drive wheels is the same, so the shear is low and little power is transferred. When the primary drive wheels start to slip, the shear increases, causing the fluid to thicken. As the fluid thickens, the torque transferred to the secondary drive wheels increases proportionally, until the maximum amount of power possible in the fully thickened state is transferred. (See also limited-slip differential, some types of which operate on the same principle.) To the operator, this system is entirely passive, engaging all four wheels to drive when needed and dropping back to two wheel drive once the need has passed. This system is generally used for on-road vehicles rather than off-road vehicles, since the maximum viscosity of the dilatant fluid limits the amount of torque that can be passed across the coupling.

=== Body armor ===
Various corporate and government entities are researching the application of shear-thickening fluids for use as body armor. Such a system could allow the wearer flexibility for a normal range of movement, yet provide rigidity to resist piercing by bullets, stabbing knife blows, and similar attacks. The principle is similar to that of mail armor, though body armor using a dilatant would be much lighter. The dilatant fluid would disperse the force of a sudden blow over a wider area of the user's body, reducing the blunt force trauma. However, the dilatant would not provide any additional protection against slow attacks, such as a slow but forceful stab, which would allow flow to occur.

In one study, standard Kevlar fabric was compared to a composite armor of Kevlar and a proprietary shear-thickening fluid. The results showed that the Kevlar/fluid combination performed better than the pure-Kevlar material, despite having less than one-third the Kevlar thickness.

Four examples of dilatant materials being used in personal protective equipment are Armourgel, D3O, ArtiLage (Artificial Cartilage foam) and "Active Protection System" manufactured by Dow Corning.

In 2002, researchers at the U.S. Army Research Laboratory and University of Delaware began researching the use of liquid armor, or a shear-thickening fluid in body armor. Researchers demonstrated that high-strength fabrics such as Kevlar can be made more bulletproof and stab-resistant when impregnated with the fluid. The goal of the “liquid armor” technology is to create a new material that is low-cost and lightweight while still offering equivalent or superior ballistic properties compared to current Kevlar fabric.

For their work on liquid armor, Dr. Eric Wetzel, an ARL mechanical engineer, and his team were awarded the 2002 Paul A. Siple Award, the Army’s highest award for scientific achievement, at the Army Science Conference.

The company D3O invented a non-Newtonian–based material that has seen wide adaptation across a broad range of standard and custom applications, including motorcycle and extreme-sports protective gear, industrial work wear, military applications, and impact protection for electronics. The materials allow flexibility during normal wear but become stiff and protective when strongly impacted. While some products are marketed directly, much of their manufacturing capability goes to selling and license the material to other companies for use in their own lines of protective products. Many competitors now exist.

== See also ==
- Newtonian fluid
- Non-Newtonian fluid
- Bingham plastic
- Colloid
- Double layer (interfacial)
- Rheology
- DLVO theory
- Hamaker theory
- Suspension (chemistry)
- Power-law fluid
- Pseudoplastic
- Silly Putty
- Liquid armor
- D3O
- Time-dependent viscosity
- Rheopecty: The longer the fluid is subjected to a shear force, the higher the viscosity. Time-dependent shear thickening behavior.
- Thixotropy: The longer a fluid is subjected to a shear force, the lower its viscosity. It is a time-dependent shear thinning behavior.
- Shear thinning: Similar to thixotropy, but independent of the passage of time.
- Thickening agent
- Paint thinner
