= Shear thinning =

Non-Newtonian fluid behavior

Classification of fluids with shear stress as a function of shear rate: Pseudoplastic, Bingham plastic and Bingham pseudoplastic all show reduction in apparent viscosity with increasing shear rate.

In rheology, shear thinning is the non-Newtonian behavior of fluids whose viscosity decreases under shear strain. It is sometimes considered synonymous with pseudo-plastic behaviour, and is usually defined as excluding time-dependent effects, such as thixotropy.

Shear thinning is the most common type of non-Newtonian behavior of fluids and is seen in many industrial and everyday applications. Although shear thinning is generally not observed in pure liquids with low molecular mass or ideal solutions of small molecules like sucrose or sodium chloride, it is often observed in polymer solutions and molten polymers, as well as complex fluids and suspensions like ketchup, whipped cream, blood, paint, and nail polish.

== Theories behind shear-thinning behaviour ==
Though the exact cause of shear thinning is not fully understood, it is widely regarded to be the effect of small structural changes within the fluid, such that microscale geometries within the fluid rearrange to facilitate shearing. In colloid systems, phase separation during flow leads to shear thinning. In polymer systems such as polymer melts and solutions, shear thinning is caused by the disentanglement of polymer chains during flow. At rest, high molecular weight polymers are entangled and randomly oriented. However, when undergoing agitation at a high enough rate, these highly anisotropic polymer chains start to disentangle and align along the direction of the shear force. This leads to less molecular/particle interaction and a larger amount of free space, decreasing the viscosity.

=== Power law model ===
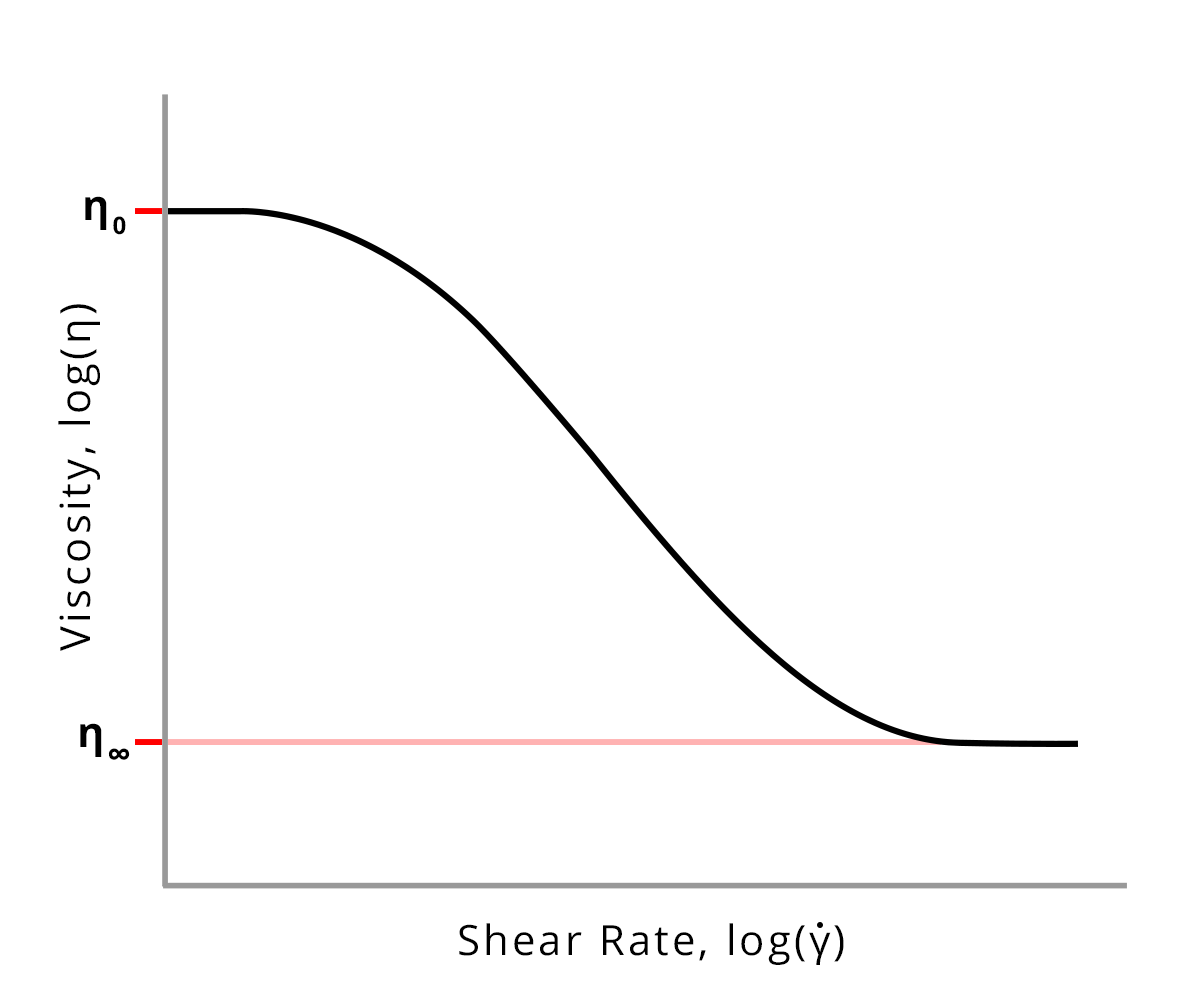
Shear thinning in a polymeric system: dependence of apparent viscosity on shear rate. η_{0} is the zero-shear-rate viscosity and η_{∞} is the infinite shear viscosity plateau.

At both sufficiently high and very low shear rates, viscosity of a polymer system is independent of the shear rate. At high shear rates, polymers are entirely disentangled and the viscosity value of the system plateaus at η_{∞}, or the infinite shear viscosity plateau. At low shear rates, the shear is too low to be impeded by entanglements and the viscosity value of the system is η_{0}, or the zero-shear-rate viscosity. The value of η_{∞} represents the lowest viscosity attainable and may be orders of magnitude lower than η_{0}, depending on the degree of shear thinning.

Viscosity is plotted against shear rate in a log(η) vs. log($\dot\gamma$) plot, where the linear region is the shear-thinning regime and can be expressed using the Ostwald and de Waele power law equation:

$$\tau = K(T)\left({d\gamma \over dt}\right)^n = K(T){\dot\gamma}^n$$

The Ostwald and de Waele equation can be written in a logarithmic form:

$$\log(\tau) = \log(K) + n\log\left(\dot{\gamma}\right)$$

The apparent viscosity is defined as $\eta={\tau \over \dot\gamma}$ , and this may be plugged into the Ostwald equation to yield a second power-law equation for apparent viscosity:

$$\eta = K(T){\dot\gamma}^{n-1}$$

This expression can also be used to describe dilatant (shear thickening) behaviour, where the value of n is greater than 1.

=== Herschel–Bulkley model ===
Bingham plastics require a critical shear stress to be exceeded in order to start flowing. This behaviour is usually seen in polymer/silica micro- and nanocomposites, where the formation of a silica network in the material provides a solid-like response at low shear stress. The shear-thinning behavior of plastic fluids can be described with the Herschel-Bulkley model, which adds a threshold shear stress component to the Ostwald equation:

$$\tau = \tau_y + K(T){\dot\gamma}^n$$

== Relationship with thixotropy ==
Some authors consider shear thinning to be a special case of thixotropic behaviour, because the recovery of the microstructure of the liquid to its initial state will always require a non-zero time. When the recovery of viscosity after disturbance is very rapid, however, the observed behaviour is classic shear thinning or pseudoplasticity, because as soon as the shear is removed, the viscosity returns to normal. When it takes a measurable time for the viscosity to recover, thixotropic behaviour is observed. In describing the viscosity of liquids, however, it is therefore useful to distinguish shear-thinning (pseudoplastic) behaviour from thixotropic behaviour, where the viscosity at all shear rates is decreased for some duration after agitation: both of these effects can often be seen separately in the same liquid.

== Everyday examples ==
Wall paint is a pseudoplastic material. When modern wall paint is applied, the shear created by the brush or roller will allow it to thin and wet out the surface evenly. Once applied, the paint regains its higher viscosity, which avoids drips and runs.

Ketchup is a shear-thinning material, viscous when at rest, but flowing at speed when agitated by squeezing, shaking, or striking the bottle.

Whipped cream is also a shear-thinning material. When whipped cream is sprayed out of its canister, it flows out smoothly from the nozzle due to the low viscosity at high flow rate. However, after whipped cream is sprayed into a spoon, it does not flow and its increased viscosity allows it to be rigid.

== See also ==
- Non-Newtonian fluid – Type of fluid
- Power-law fluid – Type of generalized Newtonian fluid
- Bingham plastic – Material which is solid at low stress but becomes viscous at high stress
- Rheology – Study of the flow of matter, primarily in a fluid state
- Kaye effect – Property of complex liquids
- Time-dependent viscosity
- Rheopecty: The longer the fluid is subjected to a shear strain, the higher the viscosity. Time-dependent shear thickening behavior.
- Thixotropy: The longer a fluid is subjected to a shear strain, the lower its viscosity. It is a time-dependent shear thinning behavior.
- Shear thickening: Similar to rheopecty, but independent of the passage of time.
- Thickening agent
- Paint thinner
