= Time-dependent viscosity =

Property of certain fluids to change viscosity over time

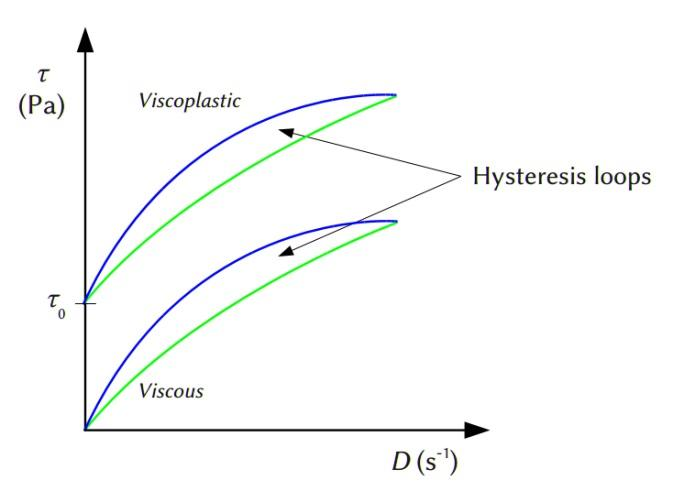
Blue: With increasing shear rate the system is breaking down Green: With decreasing shear rate the system is building up

In continuum mechanics, time-dependent viscosity is a property of fluids whose viscosity changes as a function of time. The most common type of this is thixotropy, in which the viscosity of fluids under continuous shear decreases with time; the opposite is rheopecty, in which viscosity increases with time.

== Thixotropic fluids ==
Some non-Newtonian pseudoplastic fluids show a time-dependent change in viscosity and a non-linear stress-strain behavior in which the longer the fluid undergoes shear stress, the lower its viscosity becomes. A thixotropic fluid is one that takes time to attain viscosity equilibrium when introduced to a step change in shear rate. When shearing in a thixotropic fluid exceeds a certain threshold, it results in a breakdown of the fluid's microstructure and the exhibition of a shear thinning property.

Certain gels or fluids that are thick (viscous) under static conditions will begin to thin and flow as they are shaken, agitated, or otherwise stressed. When stress ceases, they regress to their more viscous state after a passage of time. Some thixotropic fluids return to a gel state almost instantly, such as ketchup, and are called pseudoplastic fluids. Others, such as yogurt, take much longer and can become nearly solid. Many gels and colloids are thixotropic materials, exhibiting a stable form at rest but becoming increasingly fluid when agitated.

=== Examples and applications ===
Cytoplasm, synovial fluid (found in joints between some bones), and the ground substance in the human body are all thixotropic, as is semen. Some varieties of honey (e.g.heather honey)can exhibit thixotropy under certain conditions.

Some clays (including bentonite and montmorillonite) exhibit thixotropy, as do certain clay deposits found in caves (slow flowing underground streams tend to layer fine-grained sediment into mudbanks that initially appear dry and solid but then become moist and soupy when dug into or otherwise disturbed). Drilling muds used in geotechnical applications can be thixotropic.

Semi-solid casting processes such as thixomoulding use the thixotropic property of some alloys (mostly light metals, e.g. bismuth) to great advantage. Within certain temperature ranges and with appropriate preparation, these alloys can be injected into molds in a semi-solid state, resulting in a cast with less shrinkage and other superior properties than those cast in normal injection molding processes.

Solder pastes used in electronics manufacturing printing processes are thixotropic.

Many kinds of paints and inks (e.g. the plastisols used in silkscreen textile printing) exhibit thixotropic qualities. In many cases it is desirable for an ink or paint to flow sufficiently fast to form a uniform layer, but then resist further flow (which on vertical surfaces can result in sagging). Thixotropic inks that quickly regain a high viscosity are used in CMYK-type printing processes; this is necessary to protect the structure of the dots for accurate color reproduction.

Thread-locking fluid is a thixotropic adhesive that cures anaerobically.

Thixotropy has been proposed as a scientific explanation of blood liquefaction miracles such as that of Saint Januarius in Naples.

Other examples of thixotropic fluids are gelatine, shortening, cream, xanthan gum solutions, aqueous iron oxide gels, pectin gels, hydrogenated castor oil, carbon black suspension in molten tire rubber, many floc suspensions, and many colloidal suspensions.

== Rheopectic fluids ==
Basically the mirror of thixotropy, rheopectic fluids are an even rarer class of non-Newtonian fluids that exhibit a time-dependent increase in viscosity; they thicken or solidify when shaken or agitated. The longer they undergo a shearing force, the higher their viscosity becomes, as the microstructure of a rheopectic fluid builds under continuous shearing (possibly due to shear-induced crystallization).

=== Examples and Applications ===
Examples of rheopectic fluids include some gypsum pastes, printer inks, and lubricants.

There is also aggressive ongoing research into rheopectic materials especially with regard to potential uses in shock absorption. In addition to obvious potential military applications, rheopectic padding and armor could offer significant advantages over alternative materials currently in use in a wide range of fields from sporting goods and athletic footwear to skydiving and automobile safety.

Additional insights into rheopecty and the possible uses of rheopectic fluids can be gained through further research into the physics of hysteresis.

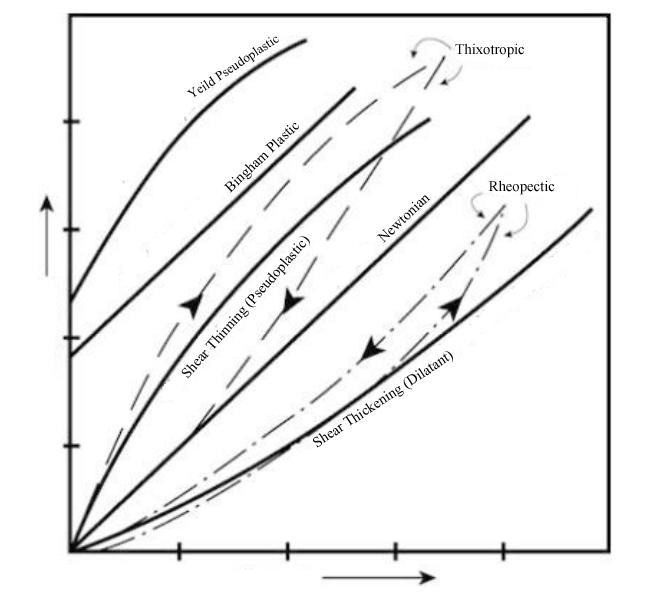
X Axis: Viscosity Y Axis: Shear Force

== See also ==
- Fluid dynamics
- Viscosity
- Rheopecty: The longer the fluid is subjected to a shear force, the higher the viscosity. Time-dependent shear thickening behavior.
- Thixotropy: The longer a fluid is subjected to a shear force, the lower its viscosity. It is a time-dependent shear thinning behavior.
- Shear thickening: Similar to rheopecty, but independent of the passage of time.
- Shear thinning: Similar to thixotropy, but independent of the passage of time.
