= D30 =

D30 may refer to:

== Vehicles ==
=== Aircraft ===
- Dewoitine D.30, a French passenger monoplane

=== Ships ===
- Brazilian destroyer Pernambuco (1961), a Pará-class destroyer of the Brazilian Navy
- Brazilian destroyer Pernambuco (1989), a Garcia-class destroyer of the Brazilian Navy
- HMS Despatch (D30), a Danae-class light cruiser of the Royal Navy
- HMS Whirlwind (D30), a W-class destroyer of the Royal Navy

=== Surface vehicles ===
- Levdeo D30, a Chinese hatchback
- LNER Class D30, a class of British steam locomotives

== Other uses ==
- 122 mm howitzer 2A18 (D-30), a Soviet howitzer
- Canon EOS D30, a digital single lens reflex camera
- D30 road (Croatia)
- Queen's Gambit Declined, a chess opening
- Soloviev D-30, a Soviet turbofan engine
- d30, a die with 30 sides

== See also ==
- D3O, with a letter "O" instead of a zero
