= Becoacht.com =

Online platform for sports coaching

becoacht.com
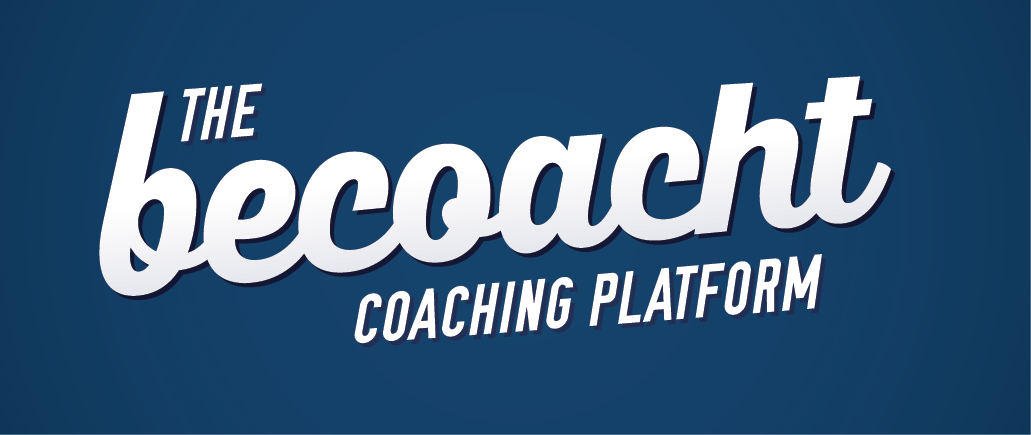
- Company type: Private
- Industry: online marketplace
- Founded: 2012
- Defunct: 2016
- Headquarters: Munich, Germany
- Key people: Frederik Roever (CEO, Founder)
- Website: becoacht.com

becoacht was an online platform for sports coaching where users could search, select and book private and public sports courses with professional coaches from a variety of sporting disciplines. The German-based enterprise received substantial media coverage within the German sports community as the first to adapt Airbnb's business model to sports coaching.

becoacht had received seed funding from Telefónica S.A. via Wayra, its start-up accelerator program.

The company was founded in 2012 by former investment banker and Rocket Internet Munich CFO Frederik Roever.

== Operation ==
becoacht was an online marketplace that connected users looking for sports coaching or courses with professional coaches who match user-defined criteria. Users could search and book according to defined criteria such as sport, location and date. Sports courses and coaches were booked and paid for directly on the website. ISPO Munich recognized becoacht's concept with the ISPO BrandNew award in 2013, as the first platform to create a dynamic booking system that included the availability of instructors.

In 2014 becoacht introduced its own branded sports courses covering a diverse range of sports, including parkour, triathlon and stand-up paddleboarding. This courses were initially offered in Munich, where becoacht headquarters were located.

In December 2014, becoacht began the process of corporate liquidation. The company was liquidated on 28 June 2016.

== Prominent athletes ==
As well as coaches across a range of disciplines, becoacht also offered training sessions with professional athletes, referred to as 'idols'. These idols were distinguished champions from a broad variety of sports and included Mirjam Jaeger, Max Weinhold, Luis Brethauer, Marco Smolla, Dominik Guehrs, and Andreas Birnbacher.
