= Richard Palmer (entrepreneur) =

British inventor and entrepreneur

- Education: Royal College of Art
- Occupations: Inventor, entrepreneur
- Known for: Inventing D3O

Richard Palmer is a British inventor and entrepreneur. He invented the impact-protection material D3O and founded the company D3O Lab, which developed it for use in sports equipment, consumer products and military gear.

== Early life and education ==
Palmer studied at the Royal College of Art in London.

== Career ==
In 1999, Palmer founded an innovation consultancy, working with clients including Herman Miller and Levi's.

Around the same time, Palmer and Philip Green, both keen snowboarders, began experimenting with a dilatant material that stays flexible in normal use but stiffens on impact. This work led to the development of D3O. The material has been used in protective equipment for sports such as skiing and motorcycling.

In 2009, D3O Lab received funding from the British Ministry of Defence to develop the material for military use, including protective clothing for soldiers.

== Recognition ==
In 2019, Palmer and Green were finalists for the European Inventor Award in the small and medium-sized enterprises (SMEs) category for their work on D3O.
