= Waldemar Pförtsch =

Waldemar Pförtsch (born 19 September 1951) is a German professor, management advisor and specialized book author for business administration and international management.

== Life ==
Pförtsch holds academic degrees in business administration and economics and obtained his Doctoral Degree in Social sciences at the Free University of Berlin. He was an advisor to the United Nations Industrial Development Organization and has been working for international consulting firms for years. After several professorships, among others as professor for International Marketing at the university of Villingen-Schwenningen, Germany (1998–2000), visiting professor at the "Kellogg Graduate School of Management", Northwestern University and Lecturer for Strategic Management at the "Lake Forest Graduate School of Management", he is currently professor for International Business at Pforzheim University of Applied Sciences and visiting professor for the executive MBA Program at the Liautaud Graduate School of Business, University of Illinois in Chicago as well as at the ITT Illinois Institute of Technology. From September 2007 to 2010 he was Marketing Professor, followed by a Research fellowship until 2011 and a position as visiting professor for Business Marketing at the China Europe International Business School (CEIBS) in Shanghai. Waldemar Pförtsch has written a number of specialized books in English and German on Marketing, International Management and Strategic Management, the latest being with US Marketing Guru Philip Kotler on B2B-Marketing, and with Indrajanto Müller on Ingredient Branding. Furthermore, he has published numerous articles in German, English and Chinese. Pförtsch is married, has three children and lives in Stuttgart, Germany.

== Publications ==
- Arthur Yeung, Katherine Xin, Waldemar Pförtsch, Shengjun Liu: The Globalization of Chinese Companies – Strategies for Conquering International Markets, Wiley (2011) ISBN 978-0470828786
- Philip Kotler, Waldemar Pförtsch: Ingredient Branding – Making the Invisible Visible, Springer Berlin (2012) ISBN 978-3642042133
- Robert Vitale, Waldemar Pförtsch, Joseph Gigierano: Business to Business Marketing, Prentice Hall (2010) ISBN 978-0136058281
- Philip Kotler, Waldemar Pförtsch, Ines Michi: Business-to-Business Brand Management – The Success Dimensions of Business Brands, Springer Berlin (2006) ISBN 3540253602
- Waldemar Pförtsch, Indrajanto Müller: Die Marke in der Marke – Bedeutung und Macht des Ingredient Branding, Springer Verlag Berlin Heidelberg New York (2006) ISBN 3-54030-057-0
- Klaus Koziol, Waldemar Pförtsch, und Steffen Heil: Social Marketing. Erfolgreiche Marketingkonzepte für non-profit Organisationen, Schäffer-Poeschel (2006) ISBN 3791025112
- Waldemar Pförtsch, Michael Schmid: B2B-Markenmanagement. Konzepte – Methoden – Fallbeispiele, Vahlen (2005) ISBN 380063144X
- Waldemar Pförtsch: Mit Strategie ins Internet. Qualifizierung als Chance für Unternehmen, BW Bildung und Wissen (2002) ISBN 3821476036
- Ekbert Hering, Waldemar Pförtsch, Peter Wordelmann: Internationalisierung des Mittelstandes, Bertelsmann Bielefeld (2001) ISBN 3763909265
