= Frederik Paul Roever =

German Internet entrepreneur (born 1980)

Frederik Paul Roever (born 22 July 1980) is a German Internet entrepreneur best known for creating the sports coaching platform becoacht.com, that was liquidated in 2016. In 2013, Roever was listed amongst the 100 most influential Internet entrepreneurs in Europe.

After working as an investment banker in London for over 6 years, he started his entrepreneurial career as the CFO and founder of Rocket Internet's Munich Office. Roever is also a strong advocate for entrepreneurial reforms in Germany and has been known to engage with top leaders in politics and industry to further this cause.
