= Rheopecty =

Property of non-Newtonian fluids whose viscosity increases with time

In continuum mechanics, rheopecty or rheopexy is the rare property of some non-Newtonian fluids to show a time-dependent increase in viscosity (time-dependent viscosity); the longer the fluid undergoes shearing force, the higher its viscosity. Rheopectic fluids, such as some lubricants, thicken or solidify when shaken. The opposite and much more common type of behaviour, in which fluids become less viscous the longer they undergo shear, is called thixotropy.

Examples of rheopectic fluids include gypsum pastes, printer inks, and synovial fluid.

There is ongoing research into new ways to make and use rheopectic materials. There is great interest in possible military uses of this technology. Moreover, the high end of the sports market has also begun to respond to it. Body armor and combat vehicle armor are key areas where efforts are being made to use rheopectic materials. Work is also being done to use these materials in other kinds of protective equipment, which is seen as potentially useful to reduce apparent impact stress in athletics, motor sports, transportation accidents, and all forms of parachuting. In particular, footwear with rheopectic shock absorption is being pursued as a dual-use technology that can provide better support to those who must frequently run, leap, climb, or descend.

== Confusion between rheopectic and dilatant fluids ==
An incorrect example often used to demonstrate rheopecty is cornstarch mixed with water (sometimes called oobleck), which is a very viscous, white fluid. It is a cheap and simple demonstration, which can be picked up by hand as a semi-solid, but flows easily when not under pressure. However, oobleck is actually a dilatant fluid, since it does not show the time-dependent, shear-induced change required in order to be labeled rheopectic. These terms are often and easily confused since the terms are rarely used; a true rheopectic fluid would at first be liquid when shaken, becoming thicker as shaking continued.

Just as the opposite behaviour of becoming thinner with time is thixotropism (time dependent pseudoplastic behaviour), rheopectic behaviour may be described as time-dependent dilatant behaviour.

== See also ==
- Time-dependent viscosity
- Thixotropy: The longer a fluid is subjected to a shear force, the lower its viscosity. It is a time-dependent shear thinning behavior.
- Shear thickening: Similar to rheopecty, but independent of the passage of time.
- Shear thinning: Similar to thixotropy, but independent of the passage of time.
