= Liquid armor =

Material with potential military applications

Liquid armor is a material under research by defense institutions and universities around the world including the United States Army Research Laboratory (ARL). Some of the earliest research in this area was performed at Massachusetts Institute of Technology and University of Delaware in 2003. Liquid armor was initially presented as a way to increase the survivability of soldiers in high risk roles while retaining their mobility, as reported by NPR in an interview with MIT professors and a U.S. admiral.

Typically, it consists of Kevlar that is soaked in one of two fluids - either a shear thickening fluid or a magnetorheological fluid. Both these fluids show the behavior of a non-Newtonian fluid, behaving like a liquid under low or normal pressure and solid under higher pressure or applied fields. The shear thickening fluid is normally made with polyethylene glycol and the solid part is made of nano-particles of silica. This liquid is soaked into all the layers of a Kevlar vest. The magnetorheological fluid consists of magnetic (typically iron) particles in a carrier fluid such as oil. They respond to magnetic fields by increasing in viscosity dramatically, almost acting like a solid.

BAE Systems has been researching a similar Kevlar vest with a fluid between layers of polymer. BAE acquired the US research company Armor Holdings, who were doing research based on suspensions of silica particles.
