= Kaye effect =

Property of complex liquids

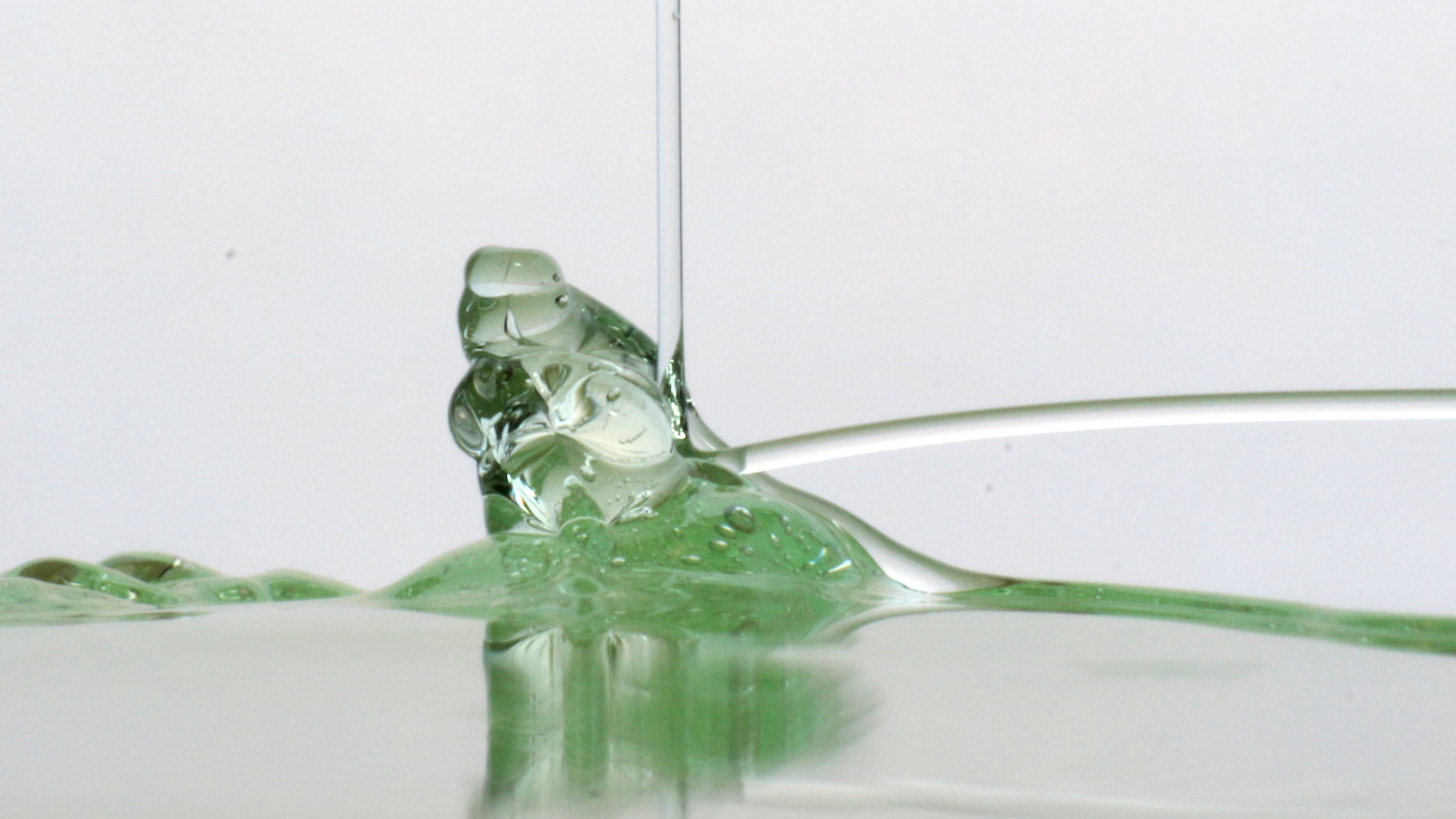
A falling stream of shampoo shows the Kaye effect.

The Kaye effect is a phenomenon observed in some complex liquids which was first described by the British engineer Alan Kaye in 1963.

While pouring one viscous mixture of an organic liquid onto a surface, the surface suddenly spouted an upcoming jet of liquid which merged with the downgoing one.

This phenomenon has since been discovered to be common in many non-Newtonian liquids (liquids with a shear-stress-dependent viscosity or viscoelastic properties). Common household liquids in this category are liquid hand soaps, shampoos and non-drip paint. The effect usually goes unnoticed, however, because it seldom lasts more than about 300 milliseconds. The effect can be sustained by pouring the liquid onto a slanted surface, preventing the outgoing jet from intersecting the downward one (which tends to end the effect).

Whilst it was long thought to occur due to a shear-thinning slip layer, recent studies have shown through high-speed videos and experiments in a vacuum chamber that an extremely thin layer of air (approximately 1000 times thinner than the jet diameter) is entrained, which acts as a lubricant and supports the sliding jet.

The current theory is that viscoelasticity is key. In a jet viscoelastic fluid, a portion of the energy of deformation as the jet falls is recoverable, and this reduces the force required to support the leaping jet, enabling more air to be entrained.
