= Thixotropy =

Change in viscosity of a gel or fluid caused by stress

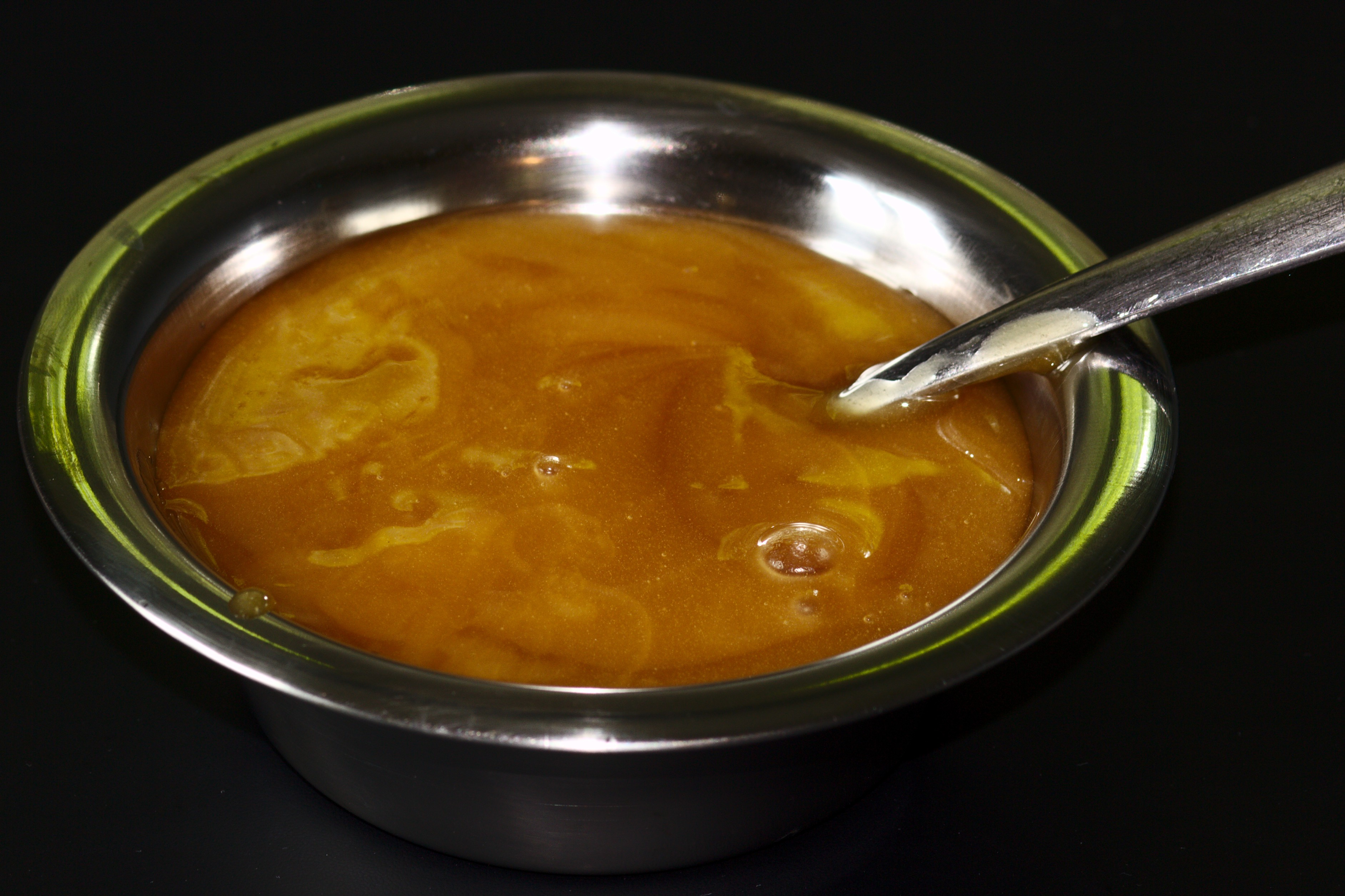
Mānuka honey is an example of a thixotropic material.

Thixotropy is a time-dependent shear thinning property. Certain gels or fluids that are thick or viscous under static conditions will flow (become thinner, less viscous) over time when shaken, agitated, shear-stressed, or otherwise stressed (time-dependent viscosity). They then take a fixed time to return to a more viscous state. Some non-Newtonian pseudoplastic fluids show a time-dependent change in viscosity; the longer the fluid undergoes shear stress, the lower its viscosity. A thixotropic fluid is a fluid which takes a finite time to attain equilibrium viscosity when introduced to a steep change in shear rate. Some thixotropic fluids return to a gel state almost instantly, such as ketchup, and are called pseudoplastic fluids. Others such as yogurt take much longer and can become nearly solid. Many gels and colloids are thixotropic materials, exhibiting a stable form at rest but becoming fluid when agitated. Thixotropy arises because particles or structured solutes require time to organize.

Some fluids are anti-thixotropic: constant shear stress for a time causes an increase in viscosity or even solidification. Fluids which exhibit this property are sometimes called rheopectic. Anti-thixotropic fluids are less well documented than thixotropic fluids.

== History ==
Many sources of thixotropy comes from the studies of Bauer and Collins as the earliest source of origin. Later in 1923, other researchers began experimenting with thixotropy and then began reporting that many gels consist of aqueous Fe_{2}O_{3} dispersions.

These researchers, Mewis and Barnes, Schalek and Szegvari, and H. Freundlich, then learned that they could make the gel turn into a liquid simply by shaking the contents. The more that was learned of this material has been found in numerous other products without the realization of the people making said products.

== Natural examples ==
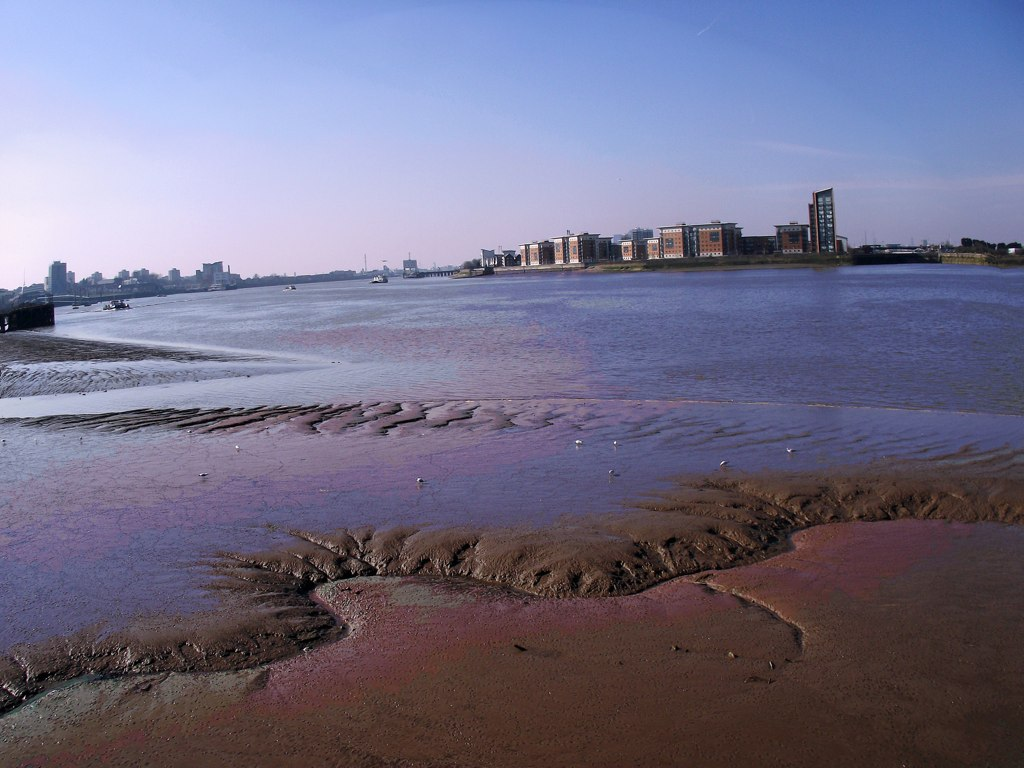
Quicksand on the shore of the River Thames. Quicksand demonstrates thixotropy in the form of shear thinning, in that it is solid when at rest, but quickly liquefies when agitated.

Some clays are thixotropic, influenced by thermochemical treatment, and their behaviour is of great importance in structural and geotechnical engineering. Landslides, such as those common in the cliffs around Lyme Regis, Dorset and in the Aberfan spoil tip disaster in Wales are evidence of this phenomenon. Similarly, a lahar is a mass of earth liquefied by a volcanic event, which rapidly solidifies once coming to rest.

Drilling fluids used in geotechnical applications can be thixotropic. Honey from honey bees may also exhibit this property under certain conditions (such as heather honey or mānuka honey).

Both cytoplasm and the ground substance in the human body are thixotropic, as is semen.

Some clay deposits found in the process of exploring caves exhibit thixotropism: an initially solid-seeming mudbank will turn soupy and yield up moisture when dug into or otherwise disturbed. These clays were deposited in the past by low-velocity streams which tend to deposit fine-grained sediment.

A thixotropic fluid is best visualised by an oar blade embedded in mud. Pressure on the oar often results in a highly viscous (more solid) thixotropic mud on the high pressure side of the blade, and low viscosity (very fluid) thixotropic mud on the low pressure side of the oar blade. Flow from the high pressure side to the low pressure side of the oar blade is non-Newtonian. (i.e., fluid velocity is not linearly proportional to the square root of the pressure differential over the oar blade).

== Applications ==
Many kinds of paints and inks—e.g., plastisols used in silkscreen textile printing—exhibit thixotropic qualities. In many cases it is desirable for the fluid to flow sufficiently to form a uniform layer, then to resist further flow, thereby preventing sagging on a vertical surface. Some other inks, such as those used in CMYK-type process printing, are designed to regain viscosity even faster, once they are applied, in order to protect the structure of the dots for accurate color reproduction.

There are several methods to using thixotropy; one method, the most popular way, is to use a two-phase mixture to model to allow the mixture to continue without added equations entering when thixotropy is working through its process on the different materials.

Thixotropic ink (along with a gas pressurized cartridge and special shearing ball design) is a key feature of the Fisher Space Pen, used for writing during zero gravity space flights by the US and Russian space programs.

Solder pastes used in electronics manufacturing printing processes are thixotropic.

Thread-locking fluid is a thixotropic adhesive that cures anaerobically.

Thixotropy has been proposed as a scientific explanation of blood liquefaction miracles such as that of Saint Januarius in Naples.

Semi-solid casting processes such as thixomoulding use the thixotropic property of some alloys (mostly light metals like magnesium). Within certain temperature ranges and with appropriate preparation, an alloy can be put into a semi-solid state, which can be injected with less shrinkage and better overall properties than by normal injection molding.

Fumed silica is commonly used as a rheology agent to make otherwise low-viscous fluids thixotropic. Examples range from foods to epoxy resin in structural bonding applications like fillet joints.

== Common use ==
Thixotropy has shown to be useful in many ways concerning cement paste. The thixotropy allows the cement to be broken down in a way that allows the user to slowly put down the paste in a controlled manner so it can then be set and dry.

Thixotropy is also used in drilling fluids due to their rheological makeup. This however is connected to drilling hydraulics and how thixotropy affects the process of hydraulics.

== Negative effects ==
While thixotropy has been seen to benefit in areas pertaining to clay and cement, the material also comes with many harmful effects. To try and prevent thixotropy from fracturing the sustainability of the concrete, catatonic polymer began to be used in order to counteract the thixotropy, however this agent is needed in order to allow the mixing of the clay and cementitious material. There is now no true way to counteract the effect of thixotropy while also allowing it to break down the materials in the cement and clay.

== Etymology ==
The word comes from Ancient Greek θίξις thixis 'touch' (from thinganein 'to touch') and -tropy, -tropous, from Ancient Greek -τρόπος -tropos 'of turning', from τρόπος tropos 'a turn', from τρέπειν trepein, 'to turn, change'. Hence, it can be translated as something that turns (or changes) when touched. It was invented by Herbert Freundlich originally for a sol-gel transformation.

== See also ==
- Bingham plastic
- Calcium Sulfate
- Kaye effect
- Nanocellulose
- Polymer
- Silly putty
- Time-dependent viscosity
