= Castor wax =

Type of wax produced from castor oil

Castor wax, also called hydrogenated castor oil, is an opaque, white vegetable wax. It is produced by the hydrogenation of pure castor oil often in the presence of a nickel catalyst to increase the rate of reaction. The hydrogenation of castor oil forms saturated molecules of castor wax; this saturation is responsible for the hard, brittle and insoluble nature of the wax.

== Uses ==
Castor wax is used in polishes, oil paints (Old Holland, Lefranc), cosmetics, electrical capacitors, carbon paper, lubrication, coatings and greases where resistance to moisture, oils and petrochemical products is required. Castor wax is also useful in polyurethane coating formulation, as it contains three secondary hydroxyl groups. These coating compositions are useful as a top coat varnish for leather, wood and rubber. Castor wax can also be added to beeswax for encaustic painting.

== Properties ==
- Melting point = 80 °C
- Acid number = 2
- Saponification value = 179
- Iodine number = 4
