= Internationale Fachmesse für Sportartikel und Sportmode =

Trade fair for sporting goods and sportswear

ISPO Munich

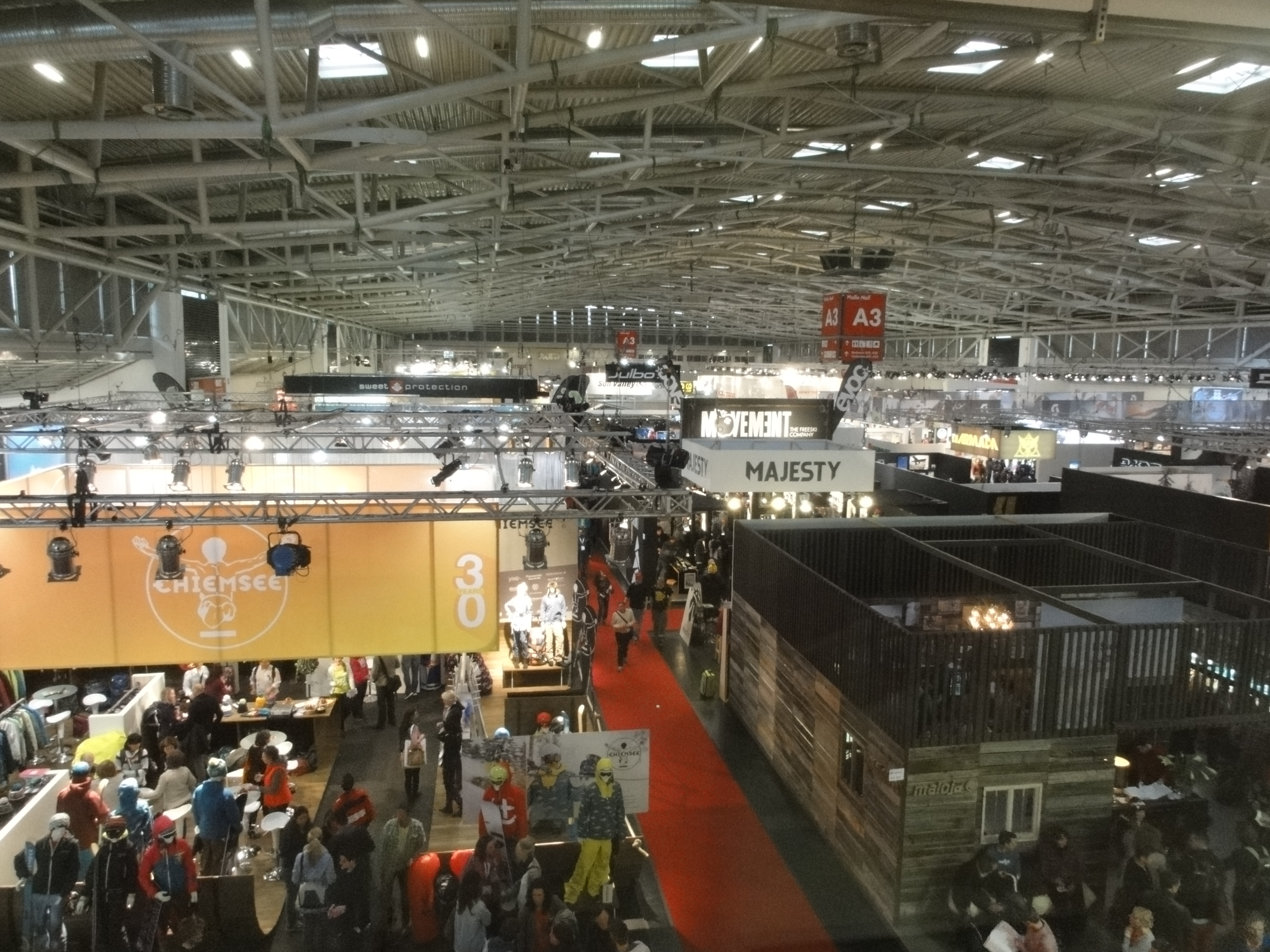
- ISPO 2011
- Status: Active
- Genre: Trade fair (Sports industry)
- Venue: Messe München
- Locations: Munich, Germany
- Country: Germany
- Inaugurated: 1970
- Attendance: 55,000 (2024)
- Organizer: Messe München GmbH
- Website: ispo.com

ISPO (originally Internationale Fachmesse für Sportartikel und Sportmode) is an international platform for the sporting goods and sports fashion industry. Founded in 1970 in Munich, Germany, ISPO has developed a global network connecting manufacturers, brands, retailers, startups, athletes and media across the sports business.

The core event, ISPO Munich, takes place annually in Munich. The event gathers over 80,000 industry professionals from more than 120 countries annually, featuring exhibitions, awards, and conferences. In addition to ISPO Munich, regional trade fairs such as ISPO Beijing and ISPO Shanghai serve the Asian markets.

Over time, ISPO has expanded its scope to include innovation, awards, and knowledge formats related to sustainability, fashion, technology, and health in sport.

== History (1970–2024) ==
=== 1970s: Foundations and Innovation ===
ISPO Munich, was established in 1970 by Messe München GmbH in Munich, Germany. The inaugural event in 1970 welcomed 816 exhibitors from 25 countries and attracted 10,777 trade visitors, with live coverage by ZDF. Due to its immediate success, the 1971 edition was extended to four days, featuring 100,000 products and introducing a dedicated textile center for sports fashion. Between 1972 and 1978, ISPO gained the nickname “Olympic trade show,” aligning with the Munich Olympic Games and drawing attention with attractions like an artificial ice rink and ski slope. A major milestone came in 1975 with the launch of the ISPO Symposium.

=== 1980s: Expansion ===
From 1979 to 1984, ISPO Munich launched its first fall edition, expanding its scope to include summer and year-round sports. In 1982, live ski fashion shows were introduced as part of the program. Between 1985 and 1989, the event saw an increase in international exhibitors and the presentation of new activities such as paragliding and snowboarding. Notable attendees during this period included Boris Becker and Willy Bogner.

=== 2000s: Global Expansion and Technology ===
From 2001 to 2009, highlights included the launch of Sport Communities (2001), ISPO Card (2002), and ISPO Vision (2004), which spotlighted crossover fashion. ISPO China debuted in 2005 and moved to Beijing in 2006, alongside the introduction of the Wearable Technology platform. The "Best Ager" initiative launched in 2007, and by 2009, sustainability and protective gear were key themes.

ISPO’s 70th edition in 2010 also marked its 40th anniversary. Rocker skis gained traction in 2011, while Healthstyle and digital marketing rose in 2012. ISPO Textrends and new service models followed in 2013, with "Health & Fitness" gaining its own hall in 2014. From 2016–2019, themes included women in sports, eSports, and digitization. In 2020, ISPO celebrated its 50th anniversary with the motto of ‘50 years of tomorrow’.

=== 2020s: Post-COVID ===
In 2021, the event adapted its scale and format due to COVID-19 restrictions. By 2022, ISPO returned to full capacity, welcoming over 40,000 visitors from 117 countries and more than 1,700 exhibitors—without any pandemic-related limitations.

The 2023 edition, held from November 28 to 30, featured over 2,400 exhibitors from 54 nations, with 93% coming from abroad—a 57% increase in international exhibitor participation. The event also featured 93 startup enterprises. In 2024, ISPO hosted another live edition at Messe Munich from December 3 to 5, gathering over 2,300 exhibitors from 50 countries. ISPO Munich 2024 attracted over 2,300 exhibitors from 50 countries and welcomed more than 55,000 professional visitors representing 113 countries. 65% of attendees and 93% of exhibitors came from outside Germany. Over half of the visitors held senior decision-making roles and more than 150 new product and technology innovations were shown during the event.

== Event Structure and focus areas ==
ISPO Munich is organized into three main arenas that collectively cover the entire value chain of the sports and outdoor industry.

Upstream & Supply focuses on sourcing, raw materials, and logistics.

Brands & Products serves as the innovation hub.

Commerce & Experience addresses how products are brought to market and experienced by consumers.

The event features Health and Wellbeing, Fashion and Apparel, Sports Technology and Wearables, Retail Experience, Digital Transformation, Urban Outdoor, organized sports and sustainability. ISPO Munich 2025 places a focus on retail through initiatives aimed at addressing the specific needs of retailers and enhancing their participation.

== Major Initiatives and platforms ==
ISPO Academy offers international conferences, seminars, and training programs for sports industry professionals. Content is delivered through webinars and video sessions.

The ISPO Retail Club is a program for retail professionals.

The Global Sports Influencer Summit facilitates community interaction and brings together individuals with influence across various sectors of the sports industry.

ISPO Brandnew (launched in 1988) is a platform for start-ups in the sports and outdoor industry. The platform helped the launch of notable brands such as GoPro, On, and Naish Kites.

ISPO Collaborators Club is B2C platform that connects athletes and sports enthusiasts with brands in the industry.

== Exhibition Categories ==
The exhibition features products and innovations in outdoor recreation, skiing and snowboarding, running and fitness, sportswear and beachwear, team sports and soccer, biking and Nordic sports, and racket sports and triathlon. It also caters to youth markets with kids’ sports equipment, and keeps pace with emerging fields through dedicated sections for wearable technologies and eSports.

== Exhibitors & Athletes at ISPO Munich ==
ISPO Munich attracts exhibitors from across the global sports and lifestyle industries. Notable participating companies include Alibaba, ASF Group, Adidas, Patagonia, Puma, Continental Chemical Industries, Decathlon, Ducati International, eBay, Everlast Europe, Helly Hansen, IHKIB, Hyosung TNC, Intersport Deutschland, Kaufland e-commerce GmbH, the Toyota Tsusho Group and others.

ISPO Munich attracts known figures from the international sports community. In 2023, former American football player and civil rights advocate Colin Kaepernick appeared at the event as a speaker. The same edition included appearances by German football coaches Thomas Tuchel and Julian Nagelsmann, who participated in sessions on leadership and athlete development. In 2024, Olympic long jump champion Malaika Mihambo attended ISPO to discuss topics related to mental resilience in sport.

== The ISPO Award ==
The ISPO Award honors products and services based on innovation, performance, and sustainability. Notable winners include the Black Diamond Pursuit Shock Trekking Pole, Mammut Eiger Nordwand Jacket, and Oakley ARO7 Helmet. ISPO has also introduced the Retail Choice Award in 2023. Winners are selected directly by retail professionals.

== Global ISPO Platforms ==
ISPO Beijing is a sports trade platform in Asia, bringing together both local and international brands across outdoor, Snowsports, running, fitness, textiles, technology, and urban sports.

ISPO Shanghai functions as a professional multi-category platform for business exchange and innovation testing. The event focus on outdoor activities, camping lifestyle, urban sports, water and winter sports, and e-commerce.
