= Ingredient branding =

In marketing, ingredient branding or ingredient marketing refers to a process in which a company markets an established ingredient or component used in its own products. The overall marketing strategy seeks to signal a high-quality product based on the perception of the ingredient.

From the ingredient company's perspective, they are not required "to convince consumers that their product is valuable, their customers do it for them".

== History ==
Chipmaker Intel's 1991 "Intel Inside" marketing campaign was the first landmark ingredient branding success. It came about in the late 1980s when the abruptly rising interest in personal computers led to a huge demand for central processing units, (CPUs) which Intel took as an imperative to "explain the desirability of its products" to end users, not just the original equipment manufacturer (OEM). In addition to Intel's advertising for "Intel Inside", it subsidized OEMs that had agreed to include the Intel Inside logo on their products and ads.

Other examples of ingredient branding include:

- NutraSweet and Canderel, a brand name for the artificial sweetener Aspartame in the food industry (Coca-Cola lite)
- Teflon as a coating for pots and pans and Gore-Tex for sportswear (both products are brand names for polytetrafluoroethylene)
- Makrolon, a plastic produced by Bayer MaterialScience
- Bitrex, a bitter substance discovered by MacFarlan Smith Ltd.
- ClickTight as a car seat installation method by Britax
- Microban for anti-microbial technology or additives
- Dolby's Dolby Digital mark on cassette tape players

== Marketing ==
Ingredient branding cannot be allocated to either industrial or consumer goods marketing. The consumer is the end-user of the ingredient, but is not part of the buying decision for the component, as this is up to the producer of the end product. On the other hand, the producer will only decide on the usage of the ingredient—or at least take it into account in the communication policy—if the image of this ingredient will affect the consumer, meaning a positive influence on his or her buying decision.

Ingredient brands "complement other brands without conflict. They go inside and aren’t necessarily identifiable visually. Their quality message carries over to the brand they’re inside of."

=== Cooperative advertising ===
Cooperative advertising may be used to incentivize the end-product manufacturer to advertise the ingredient, of which the "Intel Inside" campaign was a big example. In fact, by the end of 1992, over 500 OEMs had signed onto Intel's cooperative marketing program and 70% of OEM ads that could carry the "Intel Inside" logo did so.

== See also ==
- Co-branding
