= Non-Newtonian fluid =

Fluid with variable viscosity

In physical chemistry and fluid mechanics, a non-Newtonian fluid is a fluid that does not follow Newton's law of viscosity; that is, it has variable viscosity dependent on stress. In particular, the viscosity of non-Newtonian fluids can change when subjected to force. Ketchup, for example, becomes runnier when shaken and is thus a non-Newtonian fluid. Many salt solutions and molten polymers are non-Newtonian fluids, as are many commonly found substances such as custard, toothpaste, starch suspensions, paint, blood, melted butter and shampoo.

A common demonstration of non-Newtonian fluids involves so-called "Oobleck" (/ˈuːblɛk/), a mixture of corn or potato starch and water. It demonstrates shear thickening. With slow motions it is a moderately viscous fluid, increases in viscosity as disturbed, and briefly transforms into a near solid mass upon a sudden impact.

Most commonly, the viscosity (the gradual deformation by shear or tensile stresses) of non-Newtonian fluids is dependent on shear rate or shear rate history. Some non-Newtonian fluids with shear-independent viscosity, however, still exhibit normal stress-differences or other non-Newtonian behavior. In a Newtonian fluid, the relation between the shear stress and the shear rate is linear, passing through the origin, the constant of proportionality being the coefficient of viscosity. In a non-Newtonian fluid, the relation between the shear stress and the shear rate is different. The fluid can even exhibit time-dependent viscosity. Therefore, a constant coefficient of viscosity cannot be defined.

Although the concept of viscosity is commonly used in fluid mechanics to characterize the shear properties of a fluid, it can be inadequate to describe non-Newtonian fluids. They are best studied through several other rheological properties that relate stress and strain rate tensors under many different flow conditions—such as oscillatory shear or extensional flow—which are measured using different devices or rheometers. The properties are better studied using tensor-valued constitutive equations, which are common in the field of continuum mechanics.

For non-Newtonian fluid's viscosity, there are pseudoplastic, plastic, and dilatant flows that are time-independent, and there are thixotropic and rheopectic flows that are time-dependent. Three well-known time-dependent non-newtonian fluids which can be identified by the defining authors are the Oldroyd-B model, Walters’ Liquid B and Williamson fluids.

Time-dependent self-similar analysis of the Ladyzenskaya-type model with a non-linear velocity dependent stress tensor was performed. No analytical solutions could be derived, but a rigorous mathematical existence theorem was given for the solution.

For time-independent non-Newtonian fluids the known analytic solutions are much broader.

== Types of non-Newtonian behavior ==
=== Summary ===
Classification of fluids with shear stress as a function of shear rate. The gradient of each line represents the material's viscosity at the given shear rate.

Comparison of non-Newtonian, Newtonian, and viscoelastic properties
Behaviour	Models	Properties	Examples
Viscoelastic	Kelvin material, Maxwell material	"Parallel" linear combination of elastic and viscous effects	Some lubricants, whipped cream, Silly Putty
Time-dependent viscosity	Rheopectic	Apparent viscosity increases with duration of stress	Synovial fluid, printer ink, gypsum paste
Time-dependent viscosity	Thixotropic	Apparent viscosity decreases with duration of stress	Yogurt, peanut butter, xanthan gum solutions, aqueous iron oxide gels, gelatin gels, pectin gels, hydrogenated castor oil, some clays (including bentonite, and montmorillonite), carbon black suspension in molten tire rubber, some drilling fluids, many paints, many flocculant suspensions, many colloidal suspensions
Non-Newtonian viscosity	Shear thickening (dilatant)	Apparent viscosity increases with increased stress	Suspensions of corn starch in water (oobleck)
Non-Newtonian viscosity	Shear thinning (pseudoplastic)	Apparent viscosity decreases with increased stress	Nail polish, whipped cream, ketchup, molasses, syrups, paper pulp in water, latex paint, ice, blood, some silicone oils, some silicone coatings, sand in water
Non-Newtonian viscosity	Generalized Newtonian fluids	Viscosity is function of the shear strain rate. Stress depends on normal and shear strain rates and also the pressure applied on it	Blood plasma, custard, water

=== Shear thickening fluid ===
The viscosity of a shear thickening – i.e. dilatant – fluid appears to increase when the shear rate increases. Corn starch suspended in water ("oobleck", see below) is a common example: when stirred slowly it looks milky, when stirred vigorously it feels like a very viscous liquid.

=== Shear thinning fluid ===
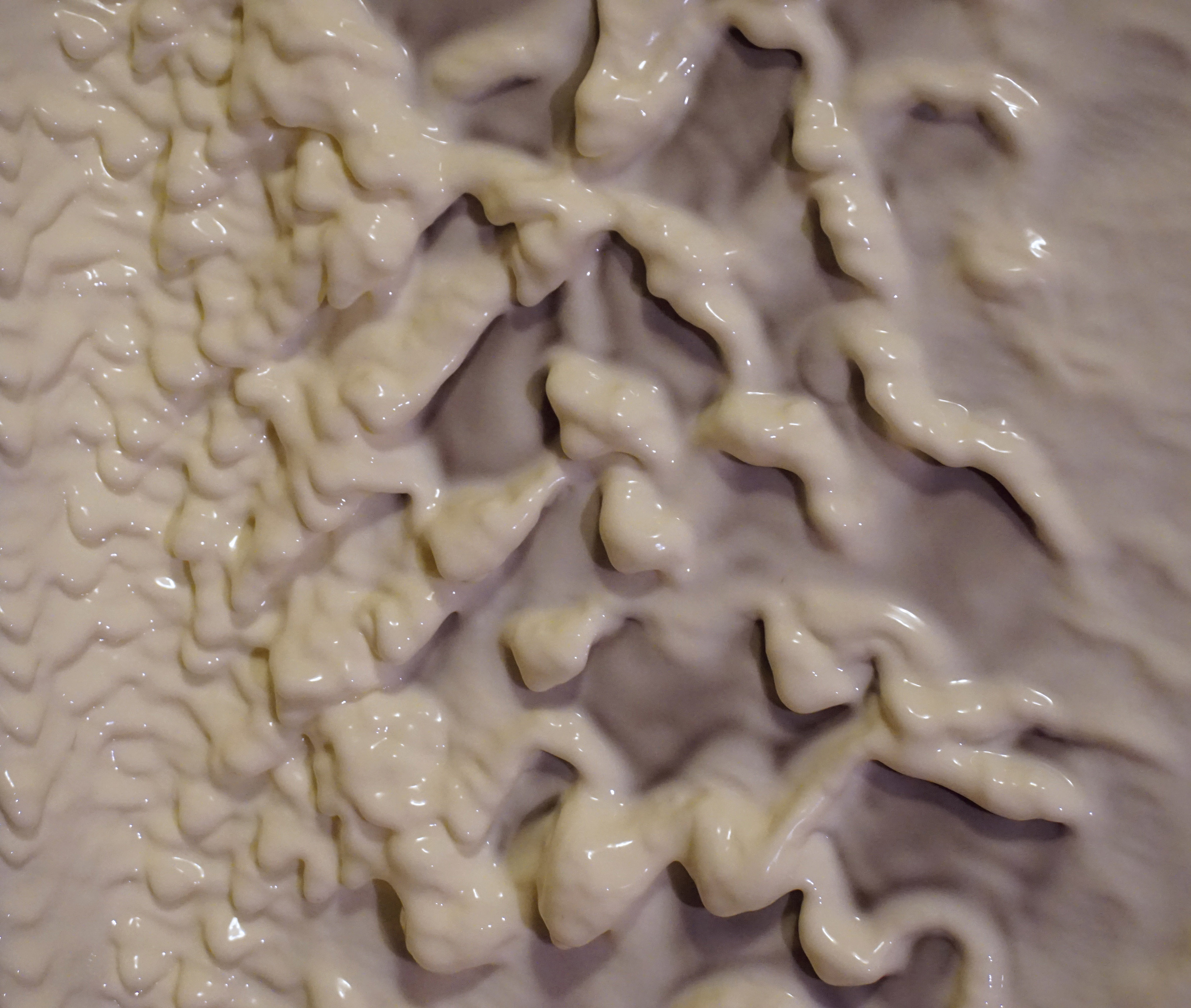
Paint is a non-Newtonian fluid. A flat surface covered with white paint is oriented vertically (before taking the picture the flat surface was horizontal, placed on a table). The fluid starts dripping down the surface but, because of its non-Newtonian nature, it is subjected to stress due to the gravitational acceleration. Therefore, instead of slipping along the surface, it forms very large and very dense droplets with limited dripping.

A familiar example of the opposite, a shear thinning fluid, or pseudoplastic fluid, is wall paint: The paint should flow readily off the brush when it is being applied to a surface but not drip excessively. Note that all thixotropic fluids are extremely shear thinning, but they are significantly time dependent, whereas the colloidal "shear thinning" fluids respond instantaneously to changes in shear rate. Thus, to avoid confusion, the latter classification is more clearly termed pseudoplastic.

Another example of a shear thinning fluid is blood. This application is highly favoured within the body, as it allows the viscosity of blood to decrease with increased shear strain rate.

=== Bingham plastic ===
Fluids that have a linear shear stress/shear strain relationship but require a finite yield stress before they begin to flow (the plot of shear stress against shear strain does not pass through the origin) are called Bingham plastics. Several examples are clay suspensions, drilling mud, toothpaste, mayonnaise, chocolate, and mustard. The surface of a Bingham plastic can hold peaks when it is still. By contrast Newtonian fluids have flat featureless surfaces when still.

=== Rheopectic or anti-thixotropic ===
There are also fluids whose strain rate is a function of time. Fluids that require a gradually increasing shear stress to maintain a constant strain rate are referred to as rheopectic. An opposite case of this is a fluid that thins out with time and requires a decreasing stress to maintain a constant strain rate (thixotropic).

== Examples ==
Many common substances exhibit non-Newtonian flows. These include:

- Soap solutions, cosmetics, and toothpaste
- Food such as butter, cheese, jam, mayonnaise, soup, and yogurt
- Natural substances such as gums, protein solutions, and extracts
- Biological fluids such as blood, saliva, semen, mucus, and synovial fluid
- agricultural waste, magma, and lava,
- Slurries such as cement slurry and paper pulp,

=== Oobleck ===
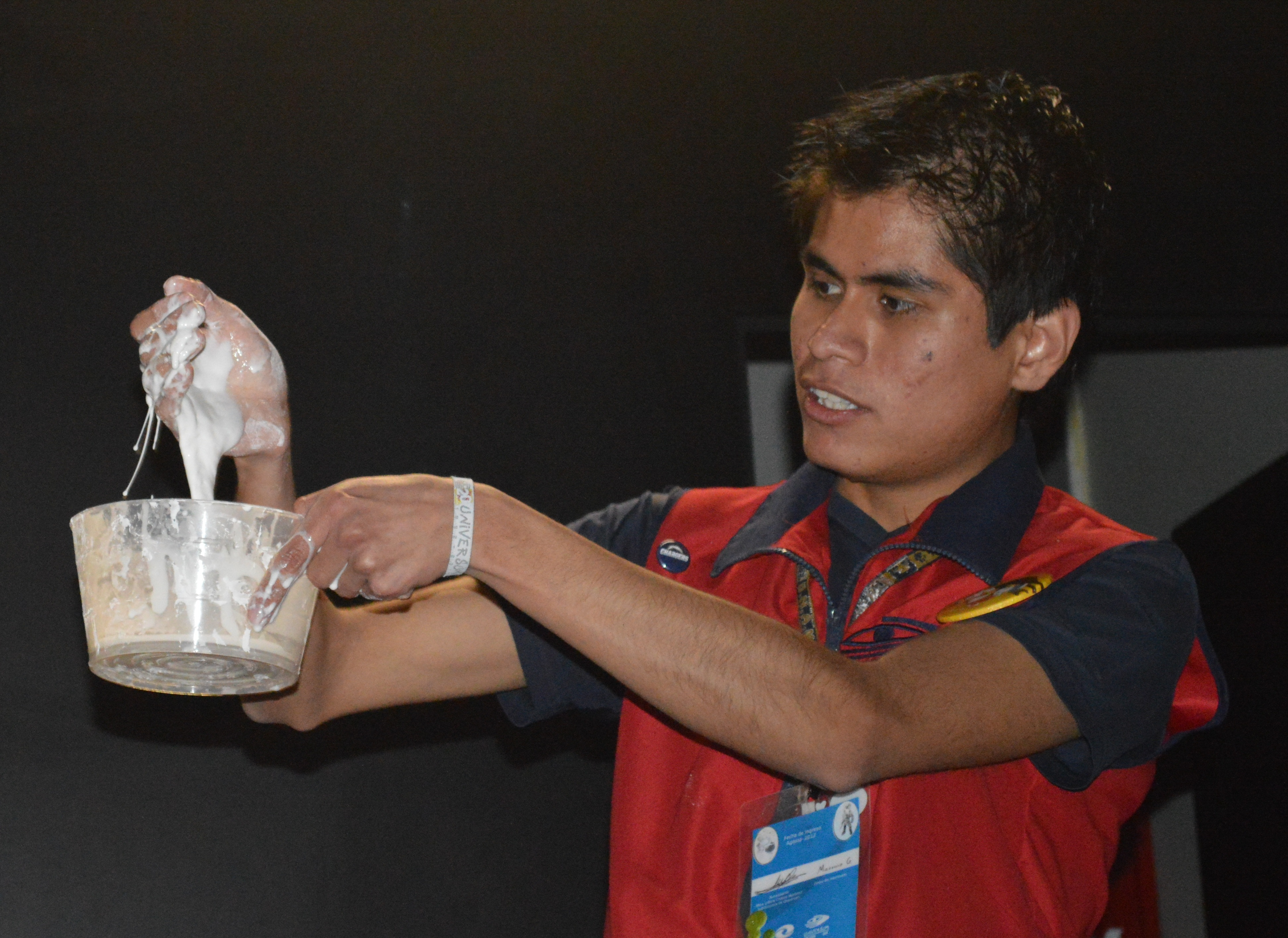
Demonstration of a non-Newtonian fluid at Universum in Mexico City

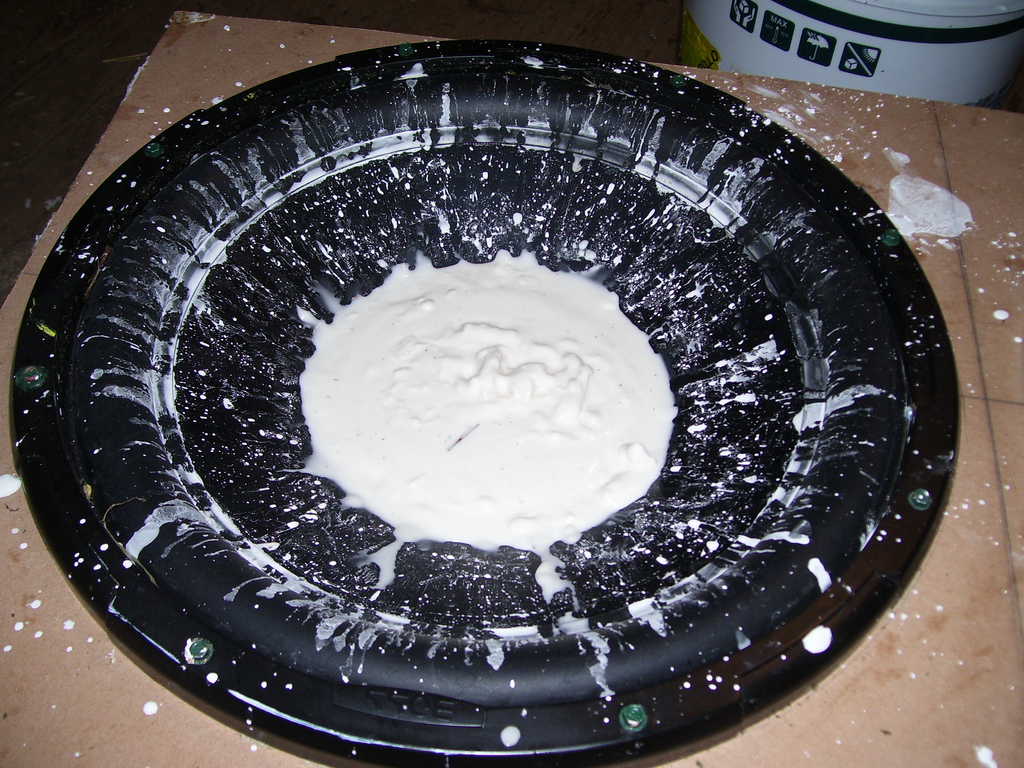
Oobleck on a subwoofer. Applying force to oobleck, by sound waves in this case, makes the non-Newtonian fluid thicken.

An inexpensive, non-toxic example of a non-Newtonian fluid is a suspension of starch (e.g., cornstarch/cornflour) in water, sometimes called "oobleck", "ooze", or "magic mud" (1 part of water to 1.5–2 parts of corn starch). The name "oobleck" is derived from the Dr. Seuss book Bartholomew and the Oobleck.

Because of its dilatant properties, oobleck is often used in demonstrations that exhibit its unusual behavior. A person may walk on a large tub of oobleck without sinking due to its shear thickening properties, as long as the individual moves quickly enough to provide enough force with each step to cause the thickening. Also, if oobleck is placed on a large subwoofer driven at a sufficiently high volume, it will thicken and form standing waves in response to low frequency sound waves from the speaker. If a person were to punch or hit oobleck, it would thicken and act like a solid. After the blow, the oobleck will go back to its thin liquid-like state.

=== Flubber (slime) ===
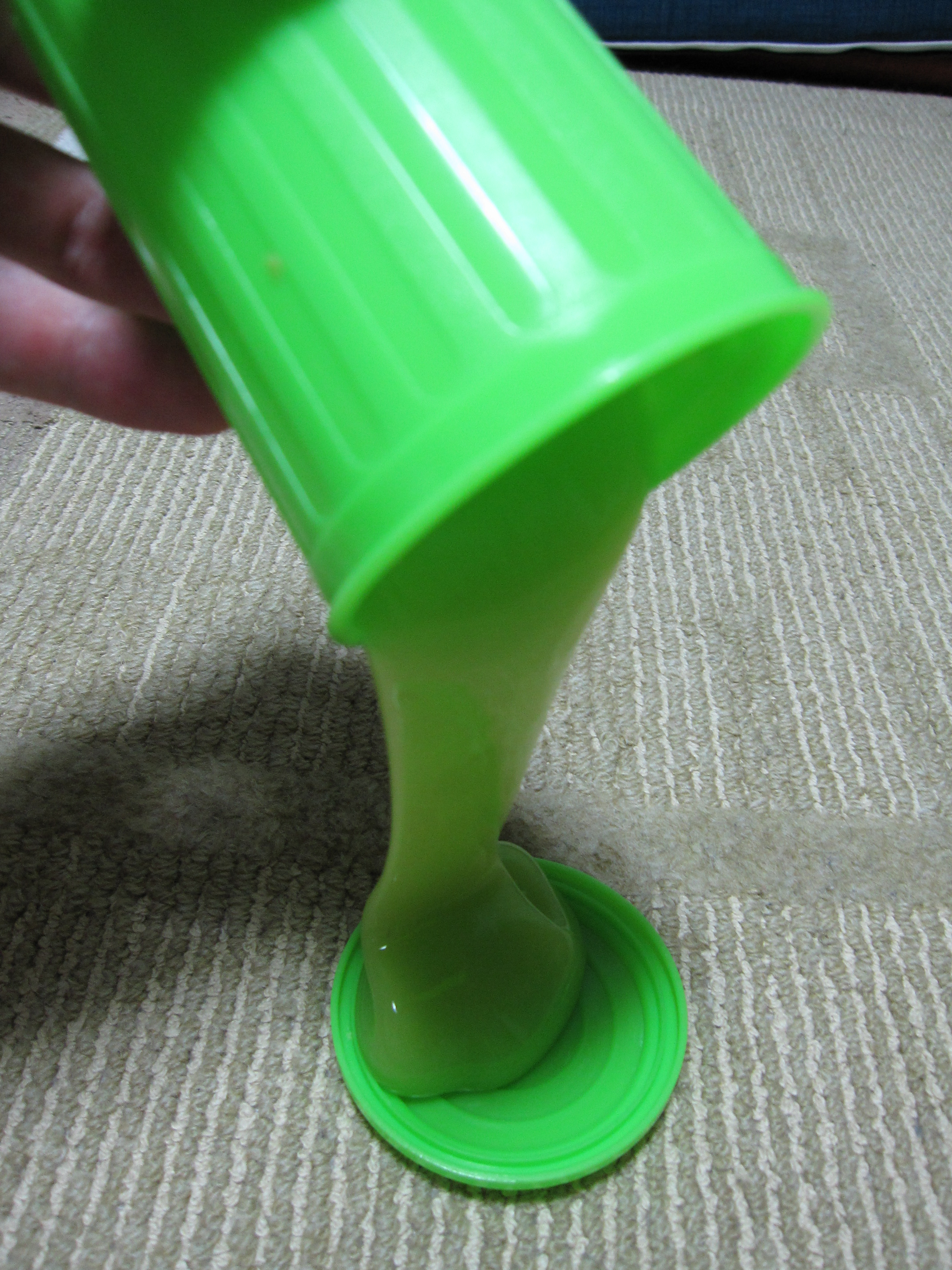
Slime flows under low stresses but breaks under higher stresses

Flubber, also commonly known as slime, is a non-Newtonian fluid, easily made from polyvinyl acetate–based glues (such as white "school" glue) and borax. It flows under low stresses but breaks under higher stresses and pressures. This combination of fluid-like and solid-like properties makes it a Maxwell fluid. Its behaviour can also be described as being viscoplastic or gelatinous.

=== Chilled caramel topping ===
Another example of non-Newtonian fluid flow is chilled caramel ice cream topping (so long as it incorporates hydrocolloids such as carrageenan and gellan gum). The sudden application of force—by stabbing the surface with a finger, for example, or rapidly inverting the container holding it—causes the fluid to behave like a solid rather than a liquid. This is the "shear thickening" property of this non-Newtonian fluid. Gentler treatment, such as slowly inserting a spoon, will leave it in its liquid state. Trying to jerk the spoon back out again, however, will trigger the return of the temporary solid state.

=== Silly Putty ===
Silly Putty is a silicone polymer based suspension that will flow, bounce, or break, depending on strain rate.

=== Plant resin ===
Plant resin is a viscoelastic solid polymer. When left in a container, it will flow slowly as a liquid to conform to the contours of its container. If struck with greater force, however, it will shatter as a solid.

=== Quicksand ===
Quicksand is a shear thinning non-Newtonian colloid that gains viscosity at rest. Quicksand's non-Newtonian properties can be observed when it experiences a slight shock (for example, when someone walks on it or agitates it with a stick), shifting between its gel and sol phase and seemingly liquefying, causing objects on the surface of the quicksand to sink.

=== Ketchup ===
Ketchup is a shear thinning fluid. Shear thinning means that the fluid viscosity decreases with increasing shear stress. In other words, fluid motion is initially difficult at slow rates of deformation, but will flow more freely at high rates. Shaking an inverted bottle of ketchup can cause it to transition to a lower viscosity through shear thinning, making it easier to pour from the bottle.

=== Dry granular flows ===
Under certain circumstances, flows of granular materials can be modelled as a continuum, for example using the μ(I) rheology. Such continuum models tend to be non-Newtonian, since the apparent viscosity of granular flows increases with pressure and decreases with shear rate. The main difference is the shearing stress and rate of shear.

== See also ==
- Complex fluid
- Dilatant
- Dissipative particle dynamics
- Generalized Newtonian fluid
- Herschel–Bulkley fluid
- Liquefaction
- Navier–Stokes equations
- Newtonian fluid
- Pseudoplastic
- Quicksand
- Quick clay
- Rheology
- Superfluids
- Thixotropy
- Weissenberg effect
