= Rheology of peanut butter =

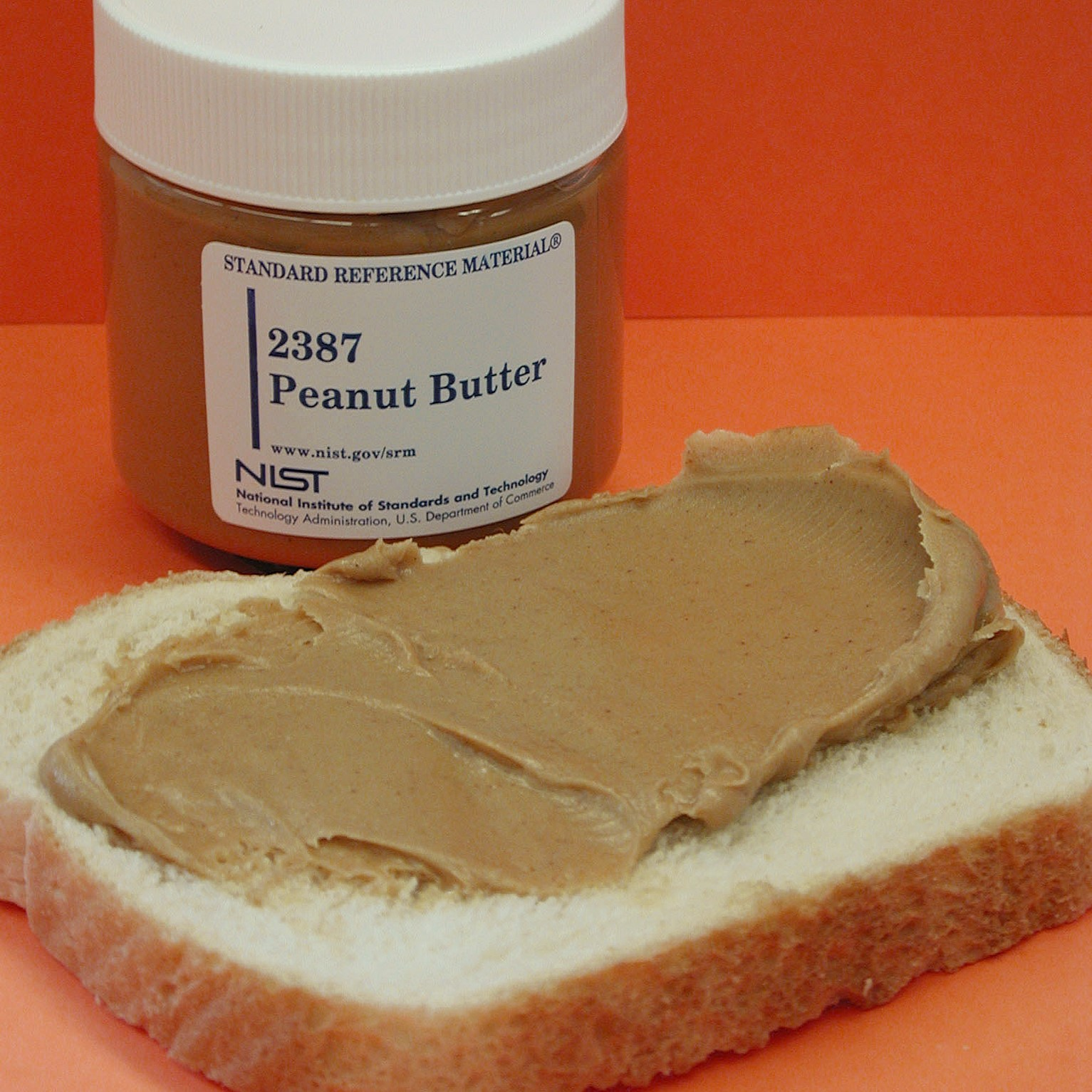
NIST standard peanut butter

Peanut butter is a viscoelastic food that exhibits both solid and fluid behaviors. It consists of ground up peanuts and may contain additional additives, such as stabilizers, sugars, or salt. Its characteristic soft, spreadable texture can be further defined through rheology – the study of flow and deformation of matter, affecting texture, consistency, and mouthfeel. Specifically for peanut butter, rheology can be used to more accurately define characteristics, such as spreadability and grittiness.

== Soft matter context ==
In a soft matter context, peanut butter can be considered as a colloidal dispersion, where solid, insoluble peanut particles are suspended in liquid oil. There are two types of peanut butter, and at room temperature, these two types of peanut butter behave differently. Non-stabilized peanut butter, also known as "natural" or "100%" peanut butter, consists only of ground peanuts and peanut oil and may contain seasonings, such as salt. In natural peanut butter at room temperature, the insoluble peanut particles separate from peanut oil, and the difference in density causes the peanut oil to float upwards. Stabilized peanut butter contains additional ingredients, such as vegetable oil, to prevent the grounded peanuts and peanut oil from separating into two layers. During the grinding process, the peanuts release oils, forming a peanut paste consisting of peanut oil and peanut grounds. The grinding process also causes an increase in the overall product temperature, and at this point a stabilizer might be added, such as hydrogenated vegetable oils. At this temperature, the stabilizer melts, uniformly dispersing into the peanut paste. This oil then crystallizes once the product returns to ambient temperatures, and the formed crystalline lattices trap the stabilizer particles within the paste. This prevents the final peanut butter from separating into two separate phases. Without the stabilizer, the peanut oil alone is not enough, as it is unable to crystallize at room temperature. The melting point of peanut oil is 3 °C (37 °F). At room temperature, the oils in natural peanut butter remain liquid, causing a phase separation. Within the stabilized peanut butter, the microstructural features are able to remain well-dispersed in a matrix of stabilized oil due to crystallization, while in the unstabilized peanut butter, the features are not able to retain the same uniformity.

== Methods to characterize peanut butter rheology ==
For most viscous semi-liquid foods, rheological characteristics are determined in shear flow using a coaxial viscometer. However, as peanut butter is not only a highly viscous material, it is also self-lubricating, meaning it releases oils under shear. If placed in a typical coaxial viscometer, the resulting flow pattern is a distorted shear flow or plug flow. For accurate data, rheometers typically require no-slip, and the properties of peanut butter do not satisfy this condition. This causes it to be particularly difficult to study its rheology. There have been a few methods devised to overcome this.

=== Squeezing flow viscosimetry ===
Squeezing flow viscosimetery uses two parallel plates to compress a fluid uniaxially. This method can be used to better understand the viscoelastic properties of peanut butter. Peanut butter samples can be placed between two lubricated plates, and samples can be subjected to either uniaxial deformation at various constant displacement rates, or to uniaxial creep deformation under various constant loads. As the plates compressed the sample, if the sample retained a cylindrical shape without bulging, this is evident that there is a lack of shear flow. Using this method, peanut butter has been determined to be a power-law fluid with shear thinning properties. In other words, under high shear rates, there is a lower apparent viscosity. This is likely due to the size difference in peanut and oil particles. The larger peanut particles likely form loosely bound aggregates that break down as shear rate increases (e.g. mixing), which allow the oil to better disperse between peanut particles, resulting in a reduced viscosity.

=== Rough plates with parallel plate rheometers ===
Another way to overcome the wall-slip effects, is to rough up the contact surface of parallel plate rheometers using a material such as sandpaper. In order to determine if this method sufficiently reduces the wall-slip effects, stress growth experiments can be conducted. If the stress over time is independent of gap size, then wall slip has been successfully reduced.

== Rheological properties ==
The apparent yield stress for the stabilized suspension (374 Pa) was significantly larger than the unstabilized sample (27 Pa) under the Bingham model. This is likely due to the effects of the stabilizing agent. During the grinding stage, the stabilizer dispersed around the peanut particles. At room temperature, the stabilizer crystallized around the particles, creating a strong network of particles within the suspension that can resist the onset of flow. In unstabilized peanut butter, the peanut oil remains in a liquid state. Even when the peanut particles are mixed in homogeneously, the peanut butter remains more liquid-like.

Previously conducted creep (stress vs. strain) experiments were conducted to determine the viscosity of peanut butter. In the stabilized peanut butter, under stresses of 250 MPa, the viscosity increases rapidly with increasing strain, exemplifying solid-like behavior. With stresses greater than 250 MPa, stabilized peanut butter displays liquid-like behavior. In an unstabilized sample, the same viscoelastic transitional behavior was found at 10 MPa.

Both stabilized and unstabilized peanut butter displayed highly non-linear behavior, and the storage (G') and loss (G'') modulus was determined. Both peanut butter types have a decrease in G' and G'' until critical strain amplitude is reached. Beyond this critical point, both moduli start to increase. The initial observed decrease was likely due to a structure breakdown under strain. Mentioned previously, the increase in strain causes loosely aggregated peanut particles to break, allowing a more homogeneous oil-peanut mixture to form. However, the increase in moduli at a critical strain implies a less homogenous structure is being formed, causing a greater resistance to flow. This might mean at some critical strain, the particles start to behave in a shear thickening manner. A possible reason could be that the maximum volume packing fraction changes with strain amplitude. Meaning at a critical strain, the flow would cause particles to create a less ordered structure resulting in an increase in viscosity.

Complex viscosity is a measure of the total resistance to flow as a function of angular frequency. For peanut butter, it was found that the initial complex viscosity as angular frequency increased was very high. However, if the angular frequency was decreased and increased again, a different behavior emerged, and the peanut butter was unable to retain the same initial complex viscosity. This shows that once the existing structure of the sample was broken, the sample's thixotropic effects, or the rheological properties dependent on flow history, are less pronounced.

== Other factors ==
By varying the grinding time of peanuts, the resulting rheology and texture of natural peanut butter (with no stabilizer) can be affected. More specifically, as grinding time increases, the apparent viscosity decreases. This is likely due to an increase in peanut oil produced by a higher grinding time, causing a lubricating effect to decrease viscosity.

Increasing the grinding time also produced peanut butter with a narrower particle size distribution with high densities. As smaller particles can compact better with less void space than larger particles, density would increase as grinding time increased. For shorter grinding times, there is a wider particle size distribution, meaning the overall peanut particle size is less uniform. This results in a wider linear viscoelastic region, and allows unstabilized peanut butter to behave more similarly to stabilized peanut butter. This is because in stabilized peanut butter, the peanuts' protein bodies and cell wall fragments are able to be more uniformly distributed throughout the peanut butter, rather than clumping. If the particle size is more widely distributed, it mimics the particle size distribution of stabilized peanut butter, resulting in a more stable natural peanut butter.

== Applications ==
The rheology of peanut butter may affect its best texture, flavor, storage stability, and overall quality. This understanding can be applied when determining better or alternative stabilizers for peanut butter or better grinding manufacturing processes for unstabilized peanut butter to prevent oil separation more effectively.
