= Generalized Newtonian fluid =

Extended mathematical model of a Newtonian fluid

In fluid mechanics, a generalized Newtonian fluid is an idealized fluid for which the shear stress is a function of shear rate at the particular time, but not dependent upon the history of deformation. Although this type of fluid is non-Newtonian (i.e. non-linear) in nature, its constitutive equation is a generalised form of the Newtonian fluid. Generalised Newtonian fluids satisfy the following rheological equation:

$$\tau = \mu_{\rm eff}( \dot{\gamma} ) \dot{\gamma}$$

where $\tau$ is the shear stress, and $\dot{\gamma}$ is the shear rate. The quantity $\mu_{\rm eff}$ represents an apparent viscosity or effective viscosity as a function of the shear rate.

The most commonly used types of generalized Newtonian fluids are:

- Power-law fluid
- Cross fluid
- Carreau fluid
- Bingham fluid

It has been shown that lubrication theory may be applied to all generalized Newtonian fluids in both two and three dimensions.

== See also ==
- Navier–Stokes equations
