= Power-law fluid =

Type of generalized Newtonian fluid

In continuum mechanics, a power-law fluid, or the Ostwald–de Waele relationship, is a type of generalized Newtonian fluid. This mathematical relationship is useful because of its simplicity, but only approximately describes the behaviour of a real non-Newtonian fluid. Power-law fluids can be subdivided into three different types of fluids based on the value of their flow behaviour index: pseudoplastic, Newtonian fluid, and dilatant. A first-order fluid is a power-law fluid with exponential dependence of viscosity on temperature. As a Newtonian fluid in a circular pipe has a quadratic velocity profile, a power-law fluid will result in a power-law velocity profile.

== Description ==
In continuum mechanics, a power-law fluid, or one exhibiting the Ostwald–de Waele relationship, is a type of generalized Newtonian fluid (time-independent non-Newtonian fluid) for which the shear stress, τ, is given by
$$\tau = K \left( \frac {\partial u} {\partial y} \right)^n$$

where:

- K is the flow consistency index (SI units Pa·s^{n}),
- ∂u/∂y is the shear rate or the velocity gradient perpendicular to the plane of shear (SI unit s^{−1}), and
- n is the flow behavior index (dimensionless).

The quantity

$$\mu_\mathrm{eff} = K \left( \frac {\partial u} {\partial y} \right)^{n-1}$$

represents an apparent or effective viscosity as a function of the shear rate (SI unit Pa s). The value of K and n can be obtained from the graph of $\log(\mu_\mathrm{eff})$ and $\log\left( \frac {\partial u} {\partial y} \right)$. The slope line gives the value of n – 1, from which n can be calculated. The intercept at $\log\left( \frac {\partial u} {\partial y} \right) = 0$ gives the value of $\log(K)$.

Also known as the Ostwald–de Waele power law after Wilhelm Ostwald and Armand de Waele, this mathematical relationship is useful because of its simplicity, but only approximately describes the behaviour of a real non-Newtonian fluid. For example, if n were less than one, the power law predicts that the effective viscosity would decrease with increasing shear rate indefinitely, requiring a fluid with infinite viscosity at rest and zero viscosity as the shear rate approaches infinity, but a real fluid has both a minimum and a maximum effective viscosity that depend on the physical chemistry at the molecular level. Therefore, the power law is only a good description of fluid behaviour across the range of shear rates to which the coefficients were fitted. There are a number of other models that better describe the entire flow behaviour of shear-dependent fluids, but they do so at the expense of simplicity, so the power law is still used to describe fluid behaviour, permit mathematical predictions, and correlate experimental data.

== Types ==
Power-law fluids can be subdivided into three different types of fluids based on the value of their flow behaviour indices:

n	Type of fluid
<1	Pseudoplastic
1	Newtonian fluid
>1	Dilatant (less common)

=== Pseudoplastic fluids ===
Pseudoplastic, or shear-thinning fluids, are those whose behaviour is time-independent and which have lower apparent viscosities at higher shear rates, and are usually solutions of large, polymeric molecules in a solvent with smaller molecules. It is generally supposed that the large molecular chains tumble at random and affect large volumes of fluid under low shear, but that they gradually align themselves in the direction of increasing shear and produce less resistance.

A common household example of a strongly shear-thinning fluid is styling gel, which is primarily composed of water and a fixative such as a vinyl acetate/vinylpyrrolidone copolymer (PVP/PA). If one were to hold a sample of hair gel in one hand and a sample of corn syrup or glycerine in the other, they would find that the hair gel is much harder to pour off the fingers (a low-shear application), but that it produces much less resistance when rubbed between the fingers (a high-shear application).

This type of behavior is widely encountered in solutions or suspensions. In these cases, large molecules or fine particles form loosely bounded aggregates or alignment groupings that are stable and reproducible at any given shear rate. But these fluids rapidly and reversibly break down or reform with an increase or decrease in shear rate. Pseudoplastic fluids show this behavior over a wide range of shear rates; however often approach a limiting Newtonian behavior at very low and very high rates of shear. These Newtonian regions are characterized by the viscosities $\mu_0$ and $\mu_\infty$ respectively.

=== Newtonian fluids ===
A Newtonian fluid is a power-law fluid with a behaviour index of 1, where the shear stress is directly proportional to the shear rate:

$$\tau = \mu \frac {\partial u} {\partial y}$$

These fluids have a constant viscosity, μ, across all shear rates and include many of the most common fluids, such as water, most aqueous solutions, oils, corn syrup, glycerine, air and other gases.

While this holds true for relatively low shear rates, at high rates most oils in reality also behave in a non-Newtonian fashion and thin. Typical examples include oil films in automotive engine shell bearings and to a lesser extent in geartooth contacts.

=== Dilatant fluids ===
Dilatant, or shear-thickening fluids increase in apparent viscosity at higher shear rates.

They are in common use in viscous couplings in automobiles. When both ends of the coupling are spinning at the same rotational speed, the viscosity of the dilatant fluid is minimal, but if the ends of the coupling differ in speed, the coupling fluid becomes very viscous. They are used to prevent all of the torque from going to one wheel when the traction on that wheel drops, e.g. when one wheel is on ice. The viscous coupling between the two driven wheels ensures that both wheels turn at the same rate, providing torque to the wheel that is not slipping. Viscous couplings are also used to keep the front axle and the rear axle spinning at the same rate in four-wheel drive passenger automobiles.

Dilatant fluids are rarely encountered in everyday situations. One common example is an uncooked paste of cornstarch and water, sometimes known as oobleck. Under high shear rates, the water is squeezed out from between the starch molecules, which are able to interact more strongly, enormously increasing the viscosity.

While not strictly a dilatant fluid, Silly Putty (viscoelastic fluid) is an example of a material that shares these viscosity characteristics.

== First-order fluid ==
A first-order fluid is a power-law fluid with exponential dependence of viscosity on temperature.

$$\mu_\mathrm{eff}(\dot \gamma, T) = \mu_0 {\dot \gamma}^{n-1} \exp (-bT)$$

where $\dot\gamma$ is the shear rate, T is temperature and μ_{0}, n and b are coefficients.

The model can be re-written as

$$\mu_\mathrm{eff}(\dot \gamma, T) = \exp \left( A_0 + A_1 \ln \dot \gamma + A_2 T  \right)$$

== Velocity profile in a circular pipe ==
Just like a Newtonian fluid in a circular pipe gives a quadratic velocity profile, a power-law fluid will result in a power-law velocity profile,

$$u(r) = \frac{n}{n+1}\left(\frac{dp}{dz}\frac{1}{2K}\right)^\frac{1}{n}\left(R^\frac{n+1}{n}-r^\frac{n+1}{n}\right)$$

where u(r) is the (radially) local axial velocity, dp/dz is the pressure gradient along the pipe, and R is the pipe radius.

== See also ==
- Power law
- Rheology
- Navier–Stokes equations
- Fluid
- Cross fluid
- Carreau fluid
- Generalized Newtonian fluid
- Herschel–Bulkley fluid
