= De Waele =

De Waele is a surname. Notable people with the surname include:

- Armand de Waele (1887–1966), British chemist
- Maurice De Waele (1896–1952), Belgian cyclist
- Bert De Waele (born 1975), Belgian cyclist
- Ellen De Waele (born 1973), Belgian film producer
- Gustav De Waele (born 2008), Belgian actor

== See also ==
- Dewaele
