= Cross fluid =

Generalized Newtonian fluid

In fluid dynamics, a Cross fluid is a type of generalized Newtonian fluid whose viscosity depends upon shear rate according to the Cross power law equation:

$$\mu_\mathrm{eff}(\dot \gamma) = \mu_\infty + \frac {\mu_0-\mu_\infty}{1 + (m\dot{\gamma})^n}$$

where $\mu_\mathrm{eff}(\dot \gamma)$ is viscosity as a function of shear rate, $\mu_\infty$ is the infinite-shear-rate viscosity, $\mu_0$ is the zero-shear-rate viscosity, $m$ is the time constant, and $n$ is the shear-thinning index.

The zero-shear viscosity $\mu_0$ is approached at very low shear rates, while the infinite shear viscosity $\mu_\infty$ is approached at very high shear rates.

When $\mu_0$ > $\mu_\infty$, the fluid exhibits shear thinning (pseudoplastic) behavior where viscosity decreases with increasing shear rate; when $\mu_0$ < $\mu_\infty$, the fluid displays shear thickening (dilatant) behavior where viscosity increases with shear rate.

It is named after Malcolm M. Cross who proposed this model in 1965.

== See also ==
- Navier-Stokes equations
- Fluid
- Carreau fluid
- Power-law fluid
- Generalized Newtonian fluid
