= Eugene C. Bingham =

American chemist (1878–1945)

- Born: Eugene Cook Bingham; December 8, 1878; Cornwall, Vermont
- Died: November 6, 1945 (aged 66); Easton, Pennsylvania
- Occupation: American chemist

Eugene Cook Bingham (8 December 1878 – 6 November 1945) was a professor and head of the department of chemistry at Lafayette College. Bingham made many contributions to rheology, a term he is credited (along with Markus Reiner) with introducing. He was a pioneer in both its theory and practice. The type of fluid known as a Bingham plastic or Bingham Fluid is named after him, as is Bingham Stress. He was also one of the people responsible for the construction of the Appalachian Trail.

== Biography ==
Bingham was born on 8 December 1878 in Cornwall, Vermont. His Father was William Harrison Bingham, Mother Mary Lucina Cook (Her Family name gave the middle name of her son). Married in Baltimore, Marylad in 1907 with Edith Irene Snell.

He was awarded the Franklin Institute's Certificate of Merit in 1921 for his variable pressure viscometer. In 1922, as chairman of the Metric Committee of the American Chemical Society, he campaigned for the United States to adopt the metric system.

Bingham died on 6 November 1945 in Easton, Pennsylvania.

== Legacy ==
The Society of Rheology has awarded the Bingham Medal annually since 1948.

== Selected publications ==
- Journal of Industrial and Engineering Chemistry (1914) vol. 6(3) pp. 233–237: A new viscometer for general scientific and technical purposes
- Journal of Physical Chemistry (1914) vol. 18(2) pp. 157–165: The Viscosity of Binary Mixtures
- Fluidity and Plasticity (1922) McGraw-Hill (Internet Digital Archive)
- Journal of Physical Chemistry (1925) vol. 29(10) pp. 1201–1204: Plasticity
- Review of Scientific Instruments (1933) vol. 4 p. 473: The New Science of Rheology
- Journal of General Physiology (1944) vol. 28 pp. 79–94, pp. 131–149 [Bingham and Roepke], (1945) vol. 28 pp. 605–626: The Rheology of Blood
