= Carreau fluid =

Type of generalized Newtonian fluid

In fluid dynamics, a Carreau fluid is a type of generalized non-Newtonian fluid (named after Pierre Carreau) where viscosity, $\mu_{\operatorname{eff}}$, depends upon the shear rate, $\dot \gamma$, by the following equation:

$$\mu_{\operatorname{eff}}(\dot \gamma) = \mu_{\operatorname{\inf}} + (\mu_0 - \mu_{\operatorname{\inf}}) \left(1+\left(\lambda \dot \gamma\right) ^2 \right) ^ {\frac {n-1} {2}}$$

Where: $\mu_0$, $\mu_{\operatorname{\inf}}$, $\lambda$ and $n$ are material coefficients: $\mu_0$ is the viscosity at zero shear rate (Pa.s), $\mu_{\operatorname{\inf}}$ is the viscosity at infinite shear rate (Pa.s), $\lambda$ is the characteristic time (s) and $n$ power index.

The dynamics of fluid motions is an important area of physics, with many important and commercially significant applications.

Computers are often used to calculate the motions of fluids, especially when the applications are of a safety critical nature.

== Shear rates ==
- At low shear rate ($\dot \gamma \ll 1/\lambda$) a Carreau fluid behaves as a Newtonian fluid with viscosity $\mu_0$.
- At intermediate shear rates ($\dot \gamma \gtrsim 1/\lambda$), a Carreau fluid behaves as a power-law fluid.
- At high shear rate, which depends on the power index $n$ and the infinite shear-rate viscosity $\mu_{\operatorname{\inf}}$, a Carreau fluid behaves as a Newtonian fluid again with viscosity $\mu_{\operatorname{\inf}}$.

== See also ==
- Navier-Stokes equations
- Fluid
- Cross fluid
- Power-law fluid
- Generalized Newtonian fluid
