= Rotational viscosity =

Viscosity is usually described as the property of a fluid which determines the rate at which local momentum differences are equilibrated. Rotational viscosity is a property of a fluid which determines the rate at which local angular momentum differences are equilibrated. In the classical case, by the equipartition theorem, at equilibrium, if particle collisions can transfer angular momentum as well as linear momentum, then these degrees of freedom will have the same average energy. If there is a lack of equilibrium between these degrees of freedom, then the rate of equilibration will be determined by the rotational viscosity coefficient.

Rotational viscosity has traditionally been thought to require rotational degrees of freedom for the fluid particles, such as in liquid crystals. In these fluids, the rotational degrees of freedom allow angular momentum to become a dynamical quantity that can be locally relaxed, leading to rotational viscosity. However, recent theoretical work has predicted that rotational viscosity ought to also be present in viscous electron fluids (see Gurzhi effect) in anisotropic metals. In these cases, the ionic lattice explicitly breaks rotational symmetry and applies torques to the electron fluid, implying non-conservation of angular momentum and hence rotational viscosity.

== Derivation and Use ==
The angular momentum density of a fluid element is written either as an antisymmetric tensor ($J_{ij}$) or, equivalently, as a pseudovector. As a tensor, the equation for the conservation of angular momentum for a simple fluid with no external forces is written:

$$\frac{\partial J_{ij}}{\partial t}+\frac{\partial (v_kJ_{ij})}{\partial x_k}=\left(
x_j\frac{\partial P_{ki}}{\partial x_k}-x_i\frac{\partial P_{kj}}{\partial x_k }\right) +(P_{ji}-P_{ij})$$

where $v_i$ is the fluid velocity and $P_{ij}$ is the total pressure tensor (or, equivalently, the negative of the total stress tensor). Note that the Einstein summation convention is used, where summation is assumed over pairs of matched indices. The angular momentum of a fluid element can be separated into extrinsic angular momentum density due to the flow ($L_{ij}$) and intrinsic angular momentum density due to the rotation of the fluid particles about their center of mass ($S_{ij}$):

$$J_{ij}=L_{ij}+S_{ij}$$

where the extrinsic angular momentum density is:

$$L_{ij}=\rho (x_i v_j-x_j v_i)$$

and $\rho$ is the mass density of the fluid element. The conservation of linear momentum equation is written:

$$\frac{\partial (\rho v_i)}{\partial t}+\frac{\partial (\rho v_i v_k)}{\partial x_k}=-\frac{\partial P_{ki}}{\partial x_k}$$

and it can be shown that this implies that:

$$\frac{\partial L_{ij}}{\partial t}+\frac{\partial (v_kL_{ij})}{\partial x_k}=\left(
x_j\frac{\partial P_{ki}}{\partial x_k}-x_i\frac{\partial P_{kj}}{\partial x_k }\right)$$

Subtracting this from the equation for the conservation of angular momentum yields:

$$\frac{\partial S_{ij}}{\partial t}+\frac{\partial (v_kS_{ij})}{\partial x_k}=P_{ji}-P_{ij}$$

Any situation in which this last term is zero will result in the total pressure tensor being symmetric, and the conservation of angular momentum equation will be redundant with the conservation of linear momentum. If, however, the internal rotational degrees of freedom of the particles are coupled to the flow (via the velocity term in the above equation), then the total pressure tensor will not be symmetric, with its antisymmetric component describing the rate of angular momentum exchange between the flow and the particle rotation.

In the linear approximation for this transport of angular momentum, the rate of flow is written:

$$P_{ij}-P_{ji}=-\eta_r\left(\frac{\partial v_i}{\partial x_j}-\frac{\partial v_j}{\partial x_i}-2\omega_{ij}\right)$$

where $\omega_{ij}$ is the average angular velocity of the rotating particles (as an antisymmetric tensor rather than a pseudovector) and $\eta_r$ is the rotational viscosity coefficient.
