= Dewaele =

Dewaele is a surname. Notable people with the surname include:

- David Dewaele (1976–2013), French actor
- David Dewaele (musician) (born 1975), Belgian musician, member of Soulwax
- Stephen Dewaele (born 1970), Belgian musician, member of Soulwax

== See also ==
- De Waele
