= Pierre Carreau =

Pierre J. Carreau is a rheologist, the author of the model of Carreau fluid. He is a professor emeritus at École Polytechnique in Montreal and the founding director of CREPEC (Center for Applied Research on Polymers and Composites presently named Center for Research on High Performance Polymer and Composite Systems).

Pierre Carreau is internationally known for his research work on the rheology of polymers, an area in which he co-authored two books and published more than 160 scientific articles, most in leading scientific journals. His best known works on rheological equations and conformation models for polymer systems are considered benchmarks in polymer engineering. The so-called Carreau Viscosity Model is now part of most software packages for the flow simulation of flow processing.

Carreau received his BASc and MASc degrees in chemical engineering from Ecole Polytechnique of Montreal and his PhD in chemical engineering from UW-Madison in 1968. Since then, he has been a professor of chemical engineering at Ecole Polytechnique. He was chairman of the department from 1973 to 1979 and later was founding director of the Applied Research Center on Polymers, CRASP, created in 1988. He has also been a member of the Administration Board of Ecole Polytechnique of Montreal since 1995.

One of Carreau's major goals has been to bridge the gap between theory and practice, translating complex molecular theories into usable results for industry. In many areas he has developed astute concepts and showed their interest for applications. In that respect, his work on mixing of polymers with helical ribbon agitators is highly recognized by the research community as well as by engineers involved in the design of polymerization reactors and other mixing systems. Carreau's ideas have been used to design large, high performance, economical industrial reactors in the U.S. and India. He has also shown interest in using larger blade helical impellers to mix difficult viscoelastic fluids and to reduce shear and prevent degradation of highly sensitive materials, such as biomaterials.

He is a Fellow of the Chemical Institute of Canada (1989), Fellow of the Canadian Academy of Engineering (2001), a Fellow of the Royal Society of Canada (2006) and a Fellow of the Society of Rheology.
