= Armand de Waele =

British chemist (1887–1966)

Armand Michel A. de Waele FRIC FInstP (17 November 1887 – December 1966) was a British chemist, noted for his contributions to rheology, and after whom the Ostwald–de Waele relationship for non-Newtonian fluids is named.

De Waele was born in Islington, London, in 1887, the son of a Belgian father and French mother. He held dual nationality until the age of 21, when he chose to be a British rather than Belgian. He obtained a BSc from the Regent Street Polytechnic then worked in the paint and linoleum industries. In 1914, the same year was conscripted into the Royal Flying Corps. That same year, he married a Frenchwoman, Jeanne Thérèse Duvivier (1892–1971), in Staines. They had two sons, John and Peter

After the First World War, he joined Gestetner as Chief Research Chemist, where he remained till 1957 when he retired. During this period he published 30 papers on rheology and patents on duplicating as well as a book. He was a Fellow of the Royal Institute of Chemistry and of the Institute of Physics.

He died in Enfield in December 1966.

== Selected publications ==
- R.S. Morrell, A. de Waele (1920) Rubber, Resins, Paints and Varnishes (Van Nostrand)
- A. de Waele Journal of the Oil & Colour Chemists Association (1923) 6, pp33–69 "Viscometry and Plastometry"
- US Patent 1744755 (1930) Stencil sheet for use in duplicating
- US Patent 1828766 (1931) Production of stencil sheets for use in duplicating
- US Patent 1819078 (1931) Stencil sheet for use in duplicating typewritten or manuscript documents, drawings and the like
- US Patent 1910005 (1933) Vulcanized or sulphurized oil composition
- Journal of the Society of Cosmetic Chemists (1956) 7, 4, pp336–346 "Introduction to the Rheology of Disperse Systems"
