= Apparent viscosity =

In fluid mechanics, shear stress divided by shear rate

The apparent viscosity of a fluid depends on the shear rate at which it is measured. The apparent viscosity of a dilatant fluid is higher when measured at a higher shear rate (η_{4} is higher than η_{3}), while the apparent viscosity of a Bingham plastic is lower (η_{2} is lower than η_{1}).

In fluid mechanics, apparent viscosity (sometimes denoted η) is the shear stress applied to a fluid divided by the shear rate:

$$\eta = \frac{\tau}{\dot\gamma}$$

For a Newtonian fluid, the apparent viscosity is constant, and equal to the Newtonian viscosity of the fluid, but for non-Newtonian fluids, the apparent viscosity depends on the shear rate. Apparent viscosity has the SI derived unit Pa·s (Pascal-second), but the centipoise is frequently used in practice: (1 mPa·s = 1 cP).

== Application ==
A single viscosity measurement at a constant speed in a typical viscometer is a measurement of the instrument viscosity of a fluid (not the apparent viscosity). In the case of non-Newtonian fluids, measurement of apparent viscosity without knowledge of the shear rate is of limited value: the measurement cannot be compared to other measurements if the speed and geometry of the two instruments is not identical. An apparent viscosity that is reported without the shear rate or information about the instrument and settings (e.g. speed and spindle type for a rotational viscometer) is meaningless.

Multiple measurements of apparent viscosity at different, well-defined shear rates, can give useful information about the non-Newtonian behaviour of a fluid, and allow it to be modeled.

== Power-law fluids ==
In many non-Newtonian fluids, the shear stress due to viscosity, $\tau_{xy}$, can be modeled by

$$\tau_{xy} = k \left (\frac{du}{dy}\right ) ^n$$

where

- k is the consistency index
- n is the flow behavior index
- du/dy is the shear rate, with velocity u and position y

These fluids are called power-law fluids.

To ensure that $\tau_{xy}$ has the same sign as du/dy, this is often written as

$$\tau_{yx} = k \left | \frac{du}{dy} \right | ^{n-1} \frac{du}{dy} = \eta \frac{du}{dy}$$

where the term

$$\eta = k \left | \frac{du}{dy} \right | ^{n-1}$$

gives the apparent viscosity.

== See also ==
- Fluid dynamics
- Rheology
- Viscosity
