= Gurzhi effect =

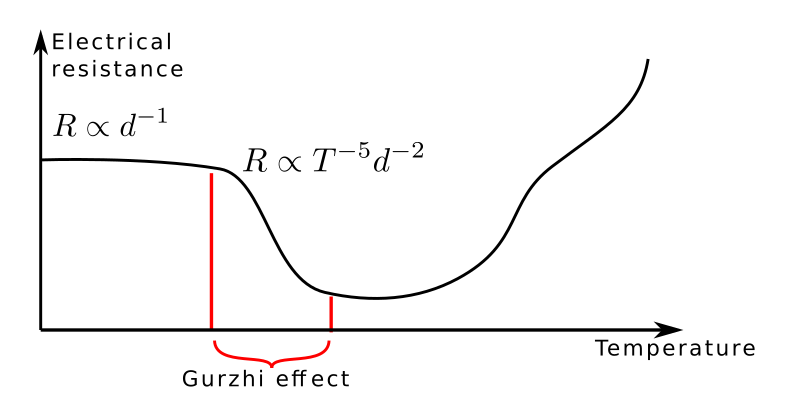
Gurzhi effect

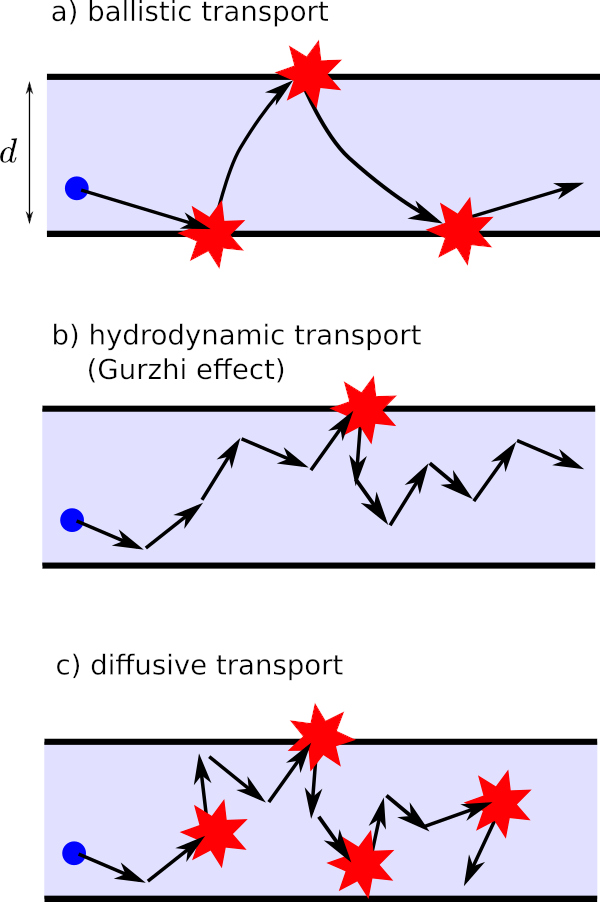
The different transport regimes are shown. Blue circle is the electron travelling in a conductor with the width d. Red stars are corresponded to the collisions with loss of total momentum of the electron system.

The Gurzhi effect was theoretically predicted by Radii Gurzhi in 1963, and it consists of decreasing of electric resistance $R$ of a finite size conductor with increasing of its temperature $T$ (i.e. the situation $dR/dT < 0$ for some temperature interval). Gurzhi effect usually being considered as the evidence of electron hydrodynamic transport in conducting media. The mechanism of Gurzhi effect is the following. The value of the resistance of the conductor is inverse to the $l_\text{lost}=\min\{l_\text{boundary}, l_V\}$ — a mean free path corresponding to the momentum loss from the electrons+phonons system
$$R\propto \frac{1}{l_\text{lost}},$$
where $l_\text{boundary}$ is the average distance which electron pass between two consecutive interactions with a boundary, and $l_{V}$ is a mean free path corresponding to other possibilities of momentum loss. The electron reflection from the boundary is assumed to be diffusive.

When temperature is low we have ballistic transport with $l_{ee} \gg d$, $l_\text{lost} \approx l_\text{boundary} \approx d$, where $d$ is a width of the conductor, $l_{ee}$ is a mean free path corresponding to effective normal electron-electron collisions (i.e. collisions without total electrons+phonons momentum loss). For low temperatures phonon emitted by electron quickly interacts with another electron without loss of total electron+phonons momentum and $l_{ee}\approx l_{ep}$, where $l_{ep}\propto T^{-5}$ is a mean free path corresponding to the electron-phonon collisions. Also we assume $d \ll l_V$. Thus the resistance for lowest temperatures is a constant $R \propto d^{-1}$(see the picture). The Gurzhi effect appears when the temperature is increased to have $l_{ee} \ll d$. In this regime the electron diffusive length between two consecutive interactions with the boundary can be considered as momentum loss free path: $l_{lost}\approx l_{boundary} \approx d^2/l_{ee}$, and the resistance is proportional to $R \propto l_{ee}(T)/d^2 \propto T^{-5}d^{-2}$, and thus we have a negative derivative $dR/dT < 0$. Therefore, Gurzhi effect can be observed when $l_{ee}\ll d \ll d^2/l_{ee} \ll l_V$.

Gurzhi effect corresponds to unusual situation when electrical resistance depends on a frequency of normal collisions. As one can see this effect appears due to the presence of a boundaries with finite characteristic size $d$. Later Gurzhi's group discovered a special role of electron hydrodynamics in a spin transport. In such a case magnetic inhomogeneity plays role of a "boundary" with spin-diffusion length as a characteristic size instead of $d$ as before. This magnetic inhomogeneity stops electrons of the one spin component which becomes an effective scatterers for electrons of another spin component. In this case magnetoresistance of a conductor depends on the frequency of normal electron-electron collisions as well as in the Gurzhi effect.
