= Viscous stress tensor =

Tensor used in continuum mechanics

The viscous stress tensor is a tensor used in continuum mechanics to model the part of the stress at a point within some material that can be attributed to the strain rate, the rate at which it is deforming around that point.

The viscous stress tensor is formally similar to the elastic stress tensor (Cauchy tensor) that describes internal forces in an elastic material due to its deformation. Both tensors map the normal vector of a surface element to the density and direction of the stress acting on that surface element. However, elastic stress is due to the amount of deformation (strain), while viscous stress is due to the rate of change of deformation over time (strain rate). In viscoelastic materials, whose behavior is intermediate between those of liquids and solids, the total stress tensor comprises both viscous and elastic ("static") components. For a completely fluid material, the elastic term reduces to the hydrostatic pressure.

In an arbitrary coordinate system, the viscous stress ε and the strain rate E at a specific point and time can be represented by 3 × 3 matrices of real numbers. In many situations there is an approximately linear relation between those matrices; that is, a fourth-order viscosity tensor μ such that ε = μE. The tensor μ has four indices and consists of 3 × 3 × 3 × 3 real numbers (of which only 21 are independent). In a Newtonian fluid, by definition, the relation between ε and E is perfectly linear, and the viscosity tensor μ is independent of the state of motion or stress in the fluid. If the fluid is isotropic as well as Newtonian, the viscosity tensor μ will have only three independent real parameters: a bulk viscosity coefficient, that defines the resistance of the medium to gradual uniform compression; a dynamic viscosity coefficient that expresses its resistance to gradual shearing, and a rotational viscosity coefficient which results from a coupling between the fluid flow and the rotation of the individual particles. In the absence of such a coupling, the viscous stress tensor will have only two independent parameters and will be symmetric. In non-Newtonian fluids, on the other hand, the relation between ε and E can be extremely non-linear, and ε may even depend on other features of the flow besides E.

== Definition ==
=== Viscous versus elastic stress ===
Internal mechanical stresses in a continuous medium are generally related to deformation of the material from some "relaxed" (unstressed) state. These stresses generally include an elastic ("static") stress component, that is related to the current amount of deformation and acts to restore the material to its rest state; and a viscous stress component, that depends on the rate at which the deformation is changing with time and opposes that change.

=== The viscous stress tensor ===
Like the total and elastic stresses, the viscous stress around a certain point in the material, at any time, can be modeled by a stress tensor, a linear relationship between the normal direction vector of an ideal plane through the point and the local stress density on that plane at that point.

In any chosen coordinate system with axes numbered 1, 2, 3, this viscous stress tensor can be represented as a 3 × 3 matrix of real numbers:

$$\varepsilon(P, t) = \begin{bmatrix}
\varepsilon_{1 1} & \varepsilon_{1 2} & \varepsilon_{1 3} \\
\varepsilon_{2 1} & \varepsilon_{2 2} & \varepsilon_{2 3} \\
\varepsilon_{3 1} & \varepsilon_{3 2} & \varepsilon_{3 3}
\end{bmatrix}\,.$$

Note that these numbers usually change with the point

$$P=(x_{P},y_{P},z_{P})
\,.$$

and time t.

Consider an infinitesimal flat surface element centered on the point p, represented by a vector dA whose length is the area of the element and whose direction is perpendicular to it. Let dF be the infinitesimal force due to viscous stress that is applied across that surface element to the material on the side opposite to dA. The components of dF along each coordinate axis are then given by

$$dF_i = \sum_j\varepsilon_{ij}\,dA_j\,.$$

In any material, the total stress tensor σ is the sum of this viscous stress tensor ε, the elastic stress tensor τ and the hydrostatic pressure p. In a perfectly fluid material, that by definition cannot have static shear stress, the elastic stress tensor is zero:

$$\sigma_{ij} = -p\delta_{ij} + \varepsilon_{ij}\,,$$

where δ_{ij} is the unit tensor, such that δ_{ij} is 1 if i = j and 0 if i ≠ j.

While the viscous stresses are generated by physical phenomena that depend strongly on the nature of the medium, the viscous stress tensor ε is only a description the local momentary forces between adjacent parcels of the material, and not a property of the material.

=== Symmetry ===
Ignoring the torque on an element due to the flow ("extrinsic" torque), the viscous "intrinsic" torque per unit volume on a fluid element is written (as an antisymmetric tensor) as

$$\tau_{ij} = \varepsilon_{ij}-\varepsilon_{ji}$$

and represents the rate of change of intrinsic angular momentum density with time. If the particles have rotational degrees of freedom, this will imply an intrinsic angular momentum and if this angular momentum can be changed by collisions, it is possible that this intrinsic angular momentum can change in time, resulting in an intrinsic torque that is not zero, which will imply that the viscous stress tensor will have an antisymmetric component with a corresponding rotational viscosity coefficient. If the fluid particles have negligible angular momentum or if their angular momentum is not appreciably coupled to the external angular momentum, or if the equilibration time between the external and internal degrees of freedom is practically zero, the torque will be zero and the viscous stress tensor will be symmetric. External forces can result in an asymmetric component to the stress tensor (e.g. ferromagnetic fluids which can suffer torque by external magnetic fields).

== Physical causes of viscous stress ==
In a solid material, the elastic component of the stress can be ascribed to the deformation of the bonds between the atoms and molecules of the material, and may include shear stresses. In a fluid, elastic stress can be attributed to the increase or decrease in the mean spacing of the particles, that affects their collision or interaction rate and hence the transfer of momentum across the fluid; it is therefore related to the microscopic thermal random component of the particles' motion, and manifests itself as an isotropic hydrostatic pressure stress.

The viscous component of the stress, on the other hand, arises from the macroscopic mean velocity of the particles. It can be attributed to friction or particle diffusion between adjacent parcels of the medium that have different mean velocities.

== The viscosity equation ==
=== The strain rate tensor ===
In a smooth flow, the rate at which the local deformation of the medium is changing over time (the strain rate) can be approximated by a strain rate tensor E(p, t), which is usually a function of the point p and time t. With respect to any coordinate system, it can be expressed by a 3 × 3 matrix.

The strain rate tensor E(p, t) can be defined as the derivative of the strain tensor e(p, t) with respect to time, or, equivalently, as the symmetric part of the gradient (derivative with respect to space) of the flow velocity vector v(p, t):

$$E = \frac{\partial e}{\partial t} = \frac{1}{2} \left((\nabla v) + (\nabla v)^\textsf{T}\right)\,,$$

where ∇v denotes the velocity gradient. In Cartesian coordinates, ∇v is the Jacobian matrix,

$$(\nabla v)_{ij} = \frac{\partial v_i}{\partial x_j}$$

and therefore

$$E_{ij} = \frac{\partial e_{ij}}{\partial t} = \frac{1}{2} \left(\frac{\partial v_j}{\partial x_i} + \frac{\partial v_i}{\partial x_j}\right)\,.$$

Either way, the strain rate tensor E(p, t) expresses the rate at which the mean velocity changes in the medium as one moves away from the point p – except for the changes due to rotation of the medium about p as a rigid body, which do not change the relative distances of the particles and only contribute to the rotational part of the viscous stress via the rotation of the individual particles themselves. (These changes comprise the vorticity of the flow, which is the curl (rotational) ∇ × v of the velocity; which is also the antisymmetric part of the velocity gradient ∇v.)

=== General flows ===
The viscous stress tensor is only a linear approximation of the stresses around a point p, and does not account for higher-order terms of its Taylor series. However in almost all practical situations these terms can be ignored, since they become negligible at the size scales where the viscous stress is generated and affects the motion of the medium. The same can be said of the strain rate tensor E as a representation of the velocity pattern around p.

Thus, the linear models represented by the tensors E and ε are almost always sufficient to describe the viscous stress and the strain rate around a point, for the purpose of modelling its dynamics. In particular, the local strain rate E(p, t) is the only property of the velocity flow that directly affects the viscous stress ε(p, t) at a given point.

On the other hand, the relation between E and ε can be quite complicated, and depends strongly on the composition, physical state, and microscopic structure of the material. It is also often highly non-linear, and may depend on the strains and stresses previously experienced by the material that is now around the point in question.

=== General Newtonian media ===
A medium is said to be Newtonian if the viscous stress ε(p, t) is a linear function of the strain rate E(p, t), and this function does not otherwise depend on the stresses and motion of fluid around p. No real fluid is perfectly Newtonian, but many important fluids, including gases and water, can be assumed to be, as long as the flow stresses and strain rates are not too high.

In general, a linear relationship between two second-order tensors is a fourth-order tensor. In a Newtonian medium, specifically, the viscous stress and the strain rate are related by the viscosity tensor μ:

$$\varepsilon_{ij} = \sum_{kl}2 \boldsymbol{\mu}_{ijkl}E_{kl}\,.$$

The viscosity coefficient μ is a property of a Newtonian material that, by definition, does not depend otherwise on v or σ.

The strain rate tensor E(p, t) is symmetric by definition, so it has only six linearly independent elements. Therefore, the viscosity tensor μ has only 6 × 9 = 54 degrees of freedom rather than 81. In most fluids the viscous stress tensor too is symmetric, which further reduces the number of viscosity parameters to 6 × 6 = 36.

== Shear and bulk viscous stress ==
Absent of rotational effects, the viscous stress tensor will be symmetric. As with any symmetric tensor, the viscous stress tensor ε can be expressed as the sum of a traceless symmetric tensor ε^{s}, and a scalar multiple ε^{v} of the identity tensor. In coordinate form,

$$\begin{align}
\varepsilon_{ij} &= \varepsilon_{ij}^\text{v} + \varepsilon_{ij}^\text{s} \\[3pt]
\varepsilon_{ij}^\text{v} &= \frac{1}{3}\delta_{ij} \sum_k\varepsilon_{kk} \\
\varepsilon_{ij}^\text{s} &= \varepsilon_{ij} - \frac{1}{3}\delta_{ij} \sum_k\varepsilon_{kk}\,.
\end{align}$$

This decomposition is independent of the coordinate system and is therefore physically significant. The constant part ε^{v} of the viscous stress tensor manifests itself as a kind of pressure, or bulk stress, that acts equally and perpendicularly on any surface independent of its orientation. Unlike the ordinary hydrostatic pressure, it may appear only while the strain is changing, acting to oppose the change; and it can be negative.

=== The isotropic Newtonian case ===
In a Newtonian medium that is isotropic (i.e. whose properties are the same in all directions), each part of the stress tensor is related to a corresponding part of the strain rate tensor.

$$\begin{align}
\varepsilon^\text{v}(p, t) &= 2 \mu^\text{v} E^\text{v}(p, t)\,, \\
\varepsilon^\text{s}(p, t) &= 2 \mu^\text{s} E^\text{s}(p, t)\,,
\end{align}$$

where E^{v} and E^{s} are the scalar isotropic and the zero-trace parts of the strain rate tensor E, and μ^{v} and μ^{s} are two real numbers. Thus, in this case the viscosity tensor μ has only two independent parameters.

The zero-trace part E^{s} of E is a symmetric 3 × 3 tensor that describes the rate at which the medium is being deformed by shearing, ignoring any changes in its volume. Thus the zero-trace part ε^{s} of ε is the familiar viscous shear stress that is associated to progressive shearing deformation. It is the viscous stress that occurs in fluid moving through a tube with uniform cross-section (a Poiseuille flow) or between two parallel moving plates (a Couette flow), and resists those motions.

The part E^{v} of E acts as a scalar multiplier (like ε^{v}), the average expansion rate of the medium around the point in question. (It is represented in any coordinate system by a 3 × 3 diagonal matrix with equal values along the diagonal.) It is numerically equal to 1/3 of the divergence of the velocity

$$\nabla \cdot v = \sum_k\frac{\partial v_k}{\partial x_k}\,,$$

which in turn is the relative rate of change of volume of the fluid due to the flow.

Therefore, the scalar part ε^{v} of ε is a stress that may be observed when the material is being compressed or expanded at the same rate in all directions. It is manifested as an extra pressure that appears only while the material is being compressed, but (unlike the true hydrostatic pressure) is proportional to the rate of change of compression rather the amount of compression, and vanishes as soon as the volume stops changing.

This part of the viscous stress, usually called bulk viscosity or volume viscosity, is often important in viscoelastic materials, and is responsible for the attenuation of pressure waves in the medium. Bulk viscosity can be neglected when the material can be regarded as incompressible (for example, when modeling the flow of water in a channel).

The coefficient μ^{v}, often denoted by η, is called the coefficient of bulk viscosity (or "second viscosity"); while μ^{s} is the coefficient of common (shear) viscosity.

== See also ==
- Vorticity equation
- Navier–Stokes equations
