= Shear rate =

Rate of change in the shear deformation of a material with respect to time

In physics, mechanics and other areas of science, shear rate is the temporal rate at which a progressive shear strain is applied to some material, causing shearing to the material. Shear rate has quantity dimension of velocity per distance, which simplifies to reciprocal time.

== Simple shear ==
The shear rate for a fluid flowing between two parallel plates, one moving at a constant speed and the other one stationary (Couette flow), is defined by

$$\dot\gamma = \frac{v}{h},$$

where:

- $\dot\gamma$ is the shear rate, measured in reciprocal seconds;
- v is the velocity of the moving plate, measured in meters per second;
- h is the distance between the two parallel plates, measured in meters.

Or:

$$\dot\gamma_{ij} = \frac{\partial v_i}{\partial x_j} + \frac{\partial v_j}{\partial x_i}.$$

For the simple shear case, it is just a gradient of velocity in a flowing material. The SI unit of measurement for shear rate is s^{−1}, expressed as "reciprocal seconds" or "inverse seconds". However, when modelling fluids in 3D, it is common to consider a scalar value for the shear rate by calculating the second invariant of the strain-rate tensor

$$\dot{\gamma}=\sqrt{2 \varepsilon:\varepsilon}$$.

The shear rate at the inner wall of a Newtonian fluid flowing within a pipe is

$$\dot\gamma = \frac{8v}{d},$$

where:

- $\dot\gamma$ is the shear rate, measured in reciprocal seconds;
- v is the linear fluid velocity;
- d is the inside diameter of the pipe.

The linear fluid velocity v is related to the volumetric flow rate Q by

$$v = \frac{Q}{A},$$

where A is the cross-sectional area of the pipe, which for an inside pipe radius of r is given by

$$A = \pi r^2,$$

thus producing

$$v = \frac{Q}{\pi r^2}.$$

Substituting the above into the earlier equation for the shear rate of a Newtonian fluid flowing within a pipe, and noting (in the denominator) that d = 2r:

$$\dot\gamma = \frac{8v}{d} = \frac{8\left(\frac{Q}{\pi r^2}\right)}{2r},$$

which simplifies to the following equivalent form for wall shear rate in terms of volumetric flow rate Q and inner pipe radius r:

$$\dot\gamma = \frac{4Q}{\pi r^3}.$$

For a Newtonian fluid wall, shear stress (τ_{w}) can be related to shear rate by $\tau_w = \dot\gamma_x \mu$ where μ is the dynamic viscosity of the fluid. For non-Newtonian fluids, there are different constitutive laws depending on the fluid, which relates the stress tensor to the shear rate tensor.

== See also ==
- Shear strain
- Strain rate
- Non-Newtonian fluid
