= Gustave Boulanger =

French figurative painter and academic (1824–1888)

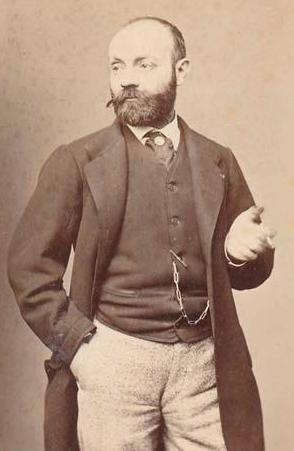
- Born: Gustave Clarence Rodolphe Boulanger; 25 April 1824; Paris, France
- Died: 22 September 1888 (aged 64); Paris, France
- Education: Pierre-Jules Jollivet; Paul Delaroche; École des Beaux-Arts, French Academy in Rome
- Works: Répétition du “Joueur de flûte” et de “La femme de Diomède” chez le prince Napoléon, 1861; Decorative paintings for the Opéra Garnier, 1875; The Slave Market, 1886
- Movement: Academic art, Orientalist art
- Awards: Prix de Rome, 1849; Chevalier of the Legion of Honor, 1865; Institut de France, 1882

Signature
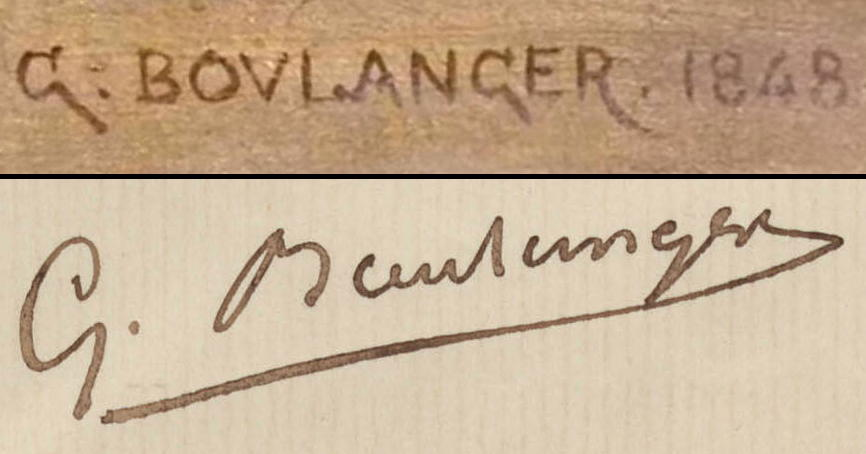

Gustave Clarence Rodolphe Boulanger (25 April 1824 – 22 September 1888) was a French figurative painter and academic artist and teacher known for his Classical and Orientalist subjects.

== Education and career ==
=== The Néo-Grecs and the Prix de Rome ===
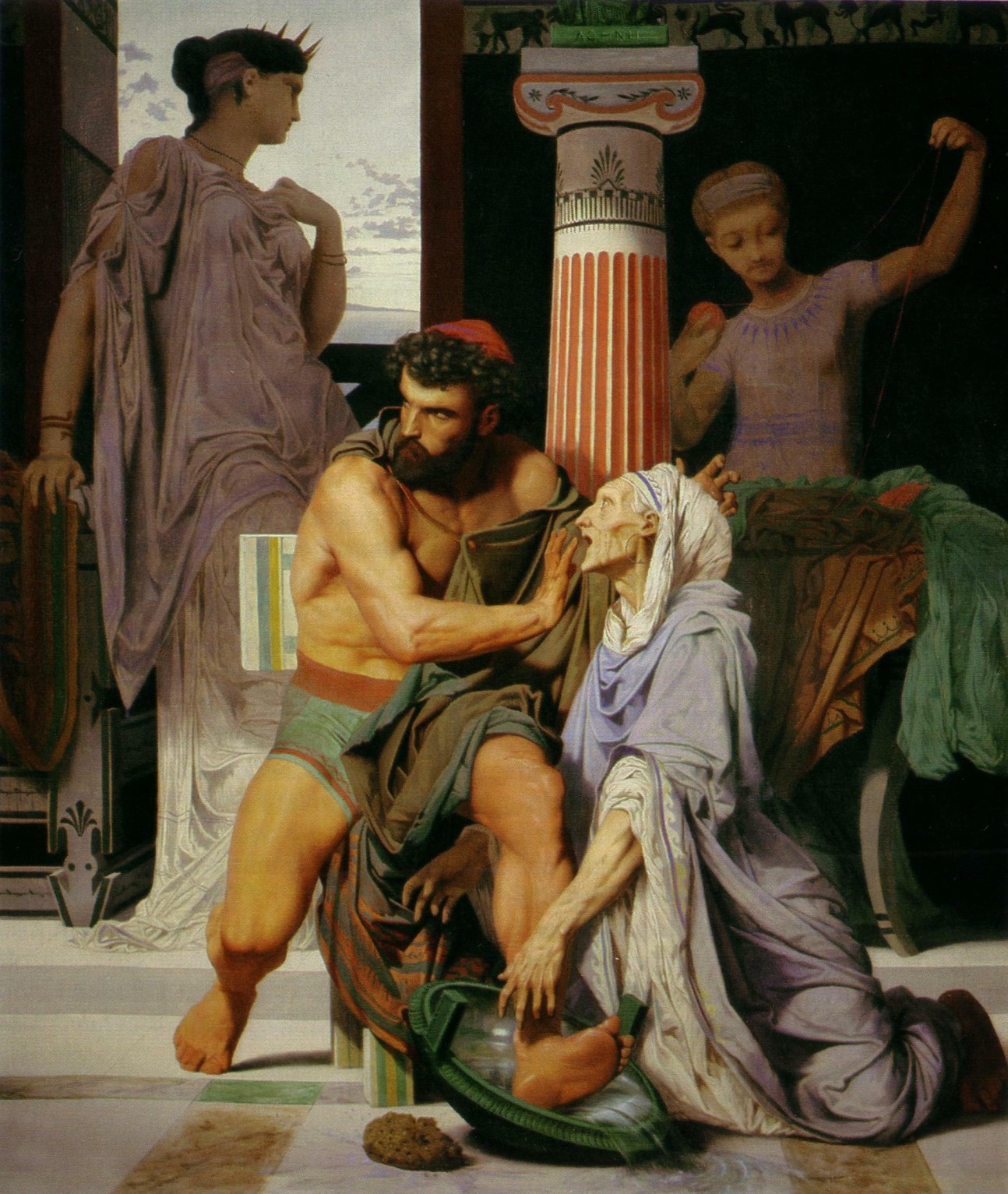
Ulysse reconnu par Euryclée, 1849, École nationale supérieure des beaux-arts, Paris

Boulanger was born in Paris in 1824. He never knew his father, and when his mother's death left him orphaned at the age of fourteen, he became the ward of his uncle, Constant Desbrosses, who in 1840 sent him to study first under the history painter Pierre-Jules Jollivet and then at the atelier of Paul Delaroche, where Boulanger met and befriended his fellow student Jean-Léon Gérôme.

Boulanger and Gérome would become leading lights of the Néo-Grec movement in French art, which revisited the fascination of previous generations for the Classical world, but brought to its austere subject matter subversive touches of whimsy, sensuality, and eroticism. "When they appear on the contemporary art scene, the Néo-Grecs will be defended as rejuvenators of the Classical tradition by some, condemned as gravediggers of history painting by others…they rarely give an orthodox image of Antiquity, some, like Gérôme, Boulanger and Hamon, not hesitating to choose licentious subjects, to parody mythological characters, or to invent very personal allegories of Antiquity."

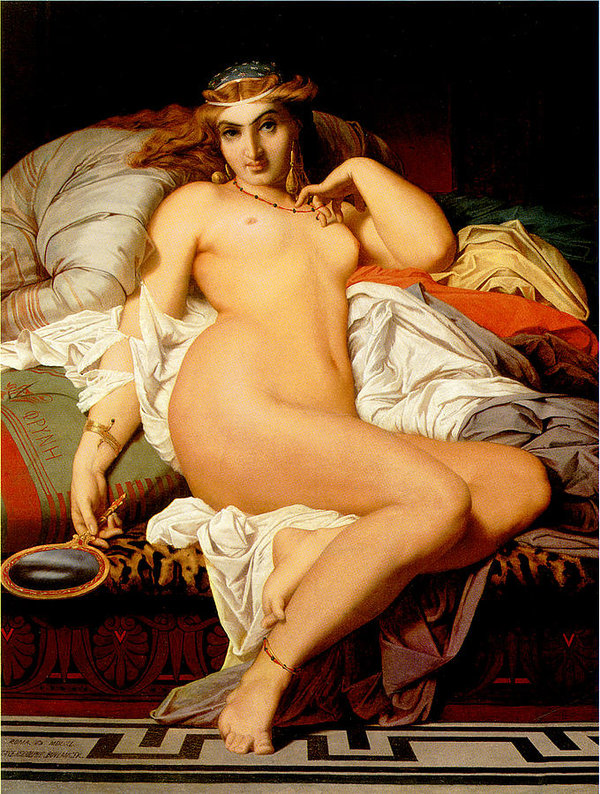
Phryné, 1850, Van Gogh Museum, Amsterdam

In 1845, Boulanger was sent by his uncle to Algeria to tend to Desbrosses's business interests there. Boulanger was fascinated by all he saw, and what was planned as a two-month stay turned to eight, until Desbrosses threatened to cut off his funds. Boulanger brought back a large number of sketches which he used for his first Orientalist paintings. (This was the first of at least three trips to North Africa, including one in 1872 with Gérôme.)

In 1848 and 1849, he shared communal living and working quarters with other artists of the Néo-Grec movement at the Chalet, 27 rue de Fleurus. The group also gathered at the atelier of Gérôme on rue de Sevres. Boulanger turned his efforts to winning the Prix de Rome, and with it, a scholarship to the Académie de France à Rome. In 1848, he obtained second place with Saint Pierre chez Marie, and the next year he won the Grand Prix with Ulysse reconnu par Euryclée and departed for Rome, where he would remain until 1855. His education and research included study at the excavations of Pompeii. He also traveled to Greece.

Each year, the students at Rome sent back to the Academy in Paris a painting to demonstrate their progress, and for public exhibition; Boulanger's works repeatedly disappointed the Academy and scandalized critics, beginning with the first, Phryné, in 1850. Wrote one reviewer:

M. Boulanger, a first year pensionnaire, spent a lot of patience to paint with great finesse…a fat naked woman with red hair and slanted blue eyes, seated on rags of all colors and a scrap of cushion on which is engraved in Greek letters her name: Phryné. To take on this marvelous beauty who inspired Praxiteles' masterpiece and the famous Venus of Apelles, an artist must impose on himself the most severe purity of design, the utmost simplicity of line, the calm splendor of beauty. M. Boulanger's Phryné is far from responding to this program.

In 1856, when his studies at Rome were complete, Boulanger took a second trip to North Africa, and then returned to Paris. Boulanger moved into his own atelier at rue de La Rochefoucauld, 64, but continued to meet and socialize with the other Néo-Grecs. He became one of Jean-Léon Gérôme's closest friends; after 1863, Gérôme regularly entrusted him with the management of his studio at the École des Beaux-Arts during his travels in the East.

=== The Pompeiian palace of Prince Napoleon ===
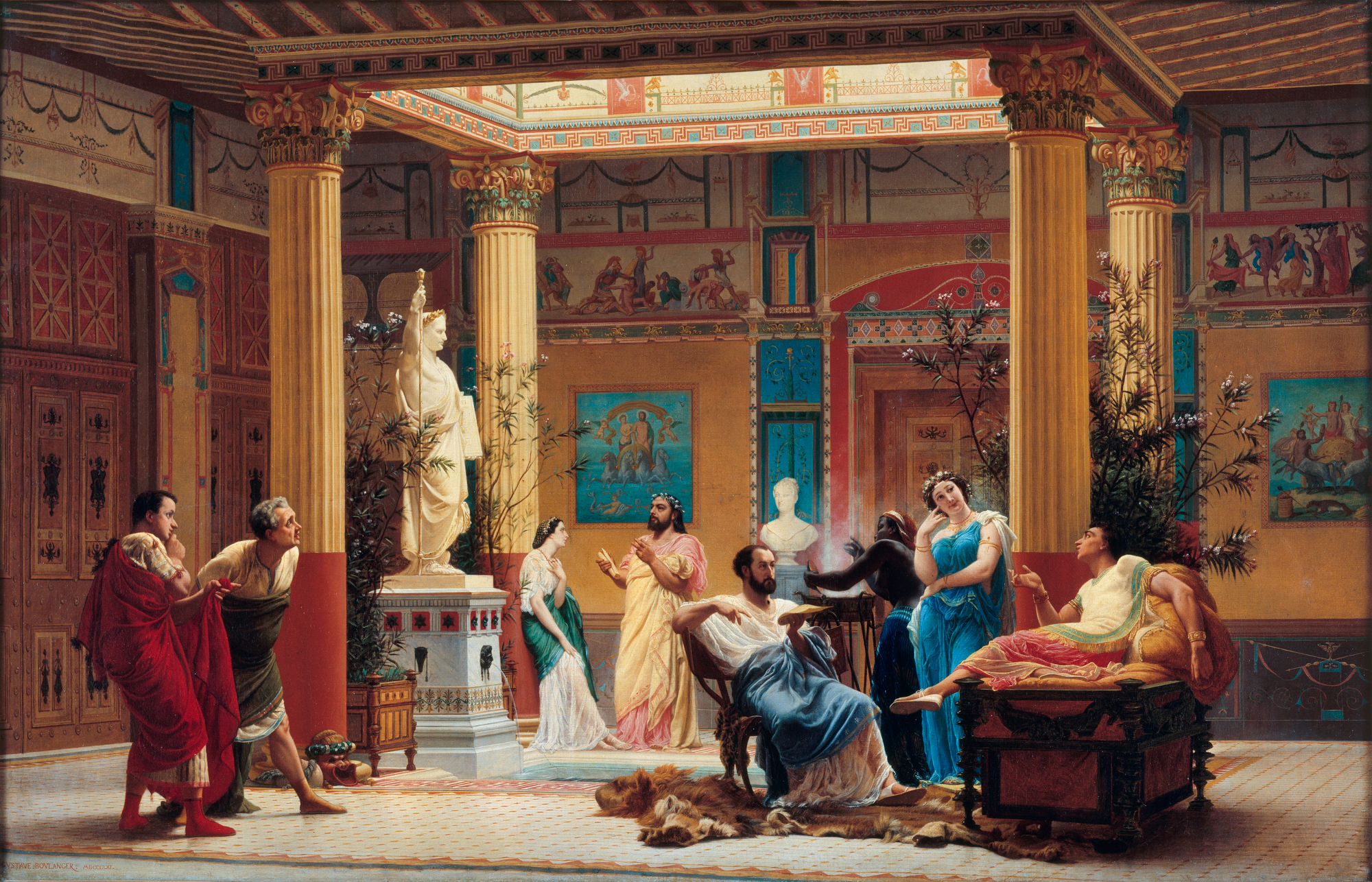
Répétition du "Joueur de flûte" et de la "Femme de Diomède" chez le prince Napoléon, 1861, Musée d'Orsay

In 1855, Prince Napoléon, cousin of Napoleon III, decided to build a palace inspired by the villas of Pompeii, in particular by the Villa of Diomedes. The palace had rooms around an atrium open to the sky with a shallow pool below. Busts of the Bonaparte family surrounded the atrium, with a white marble statue of Napoleon I presiding in the guise of a deified Caesar. Gérôme took part in the project by making three paintings that he considered "perhaps the most beautiful things he ever signed."

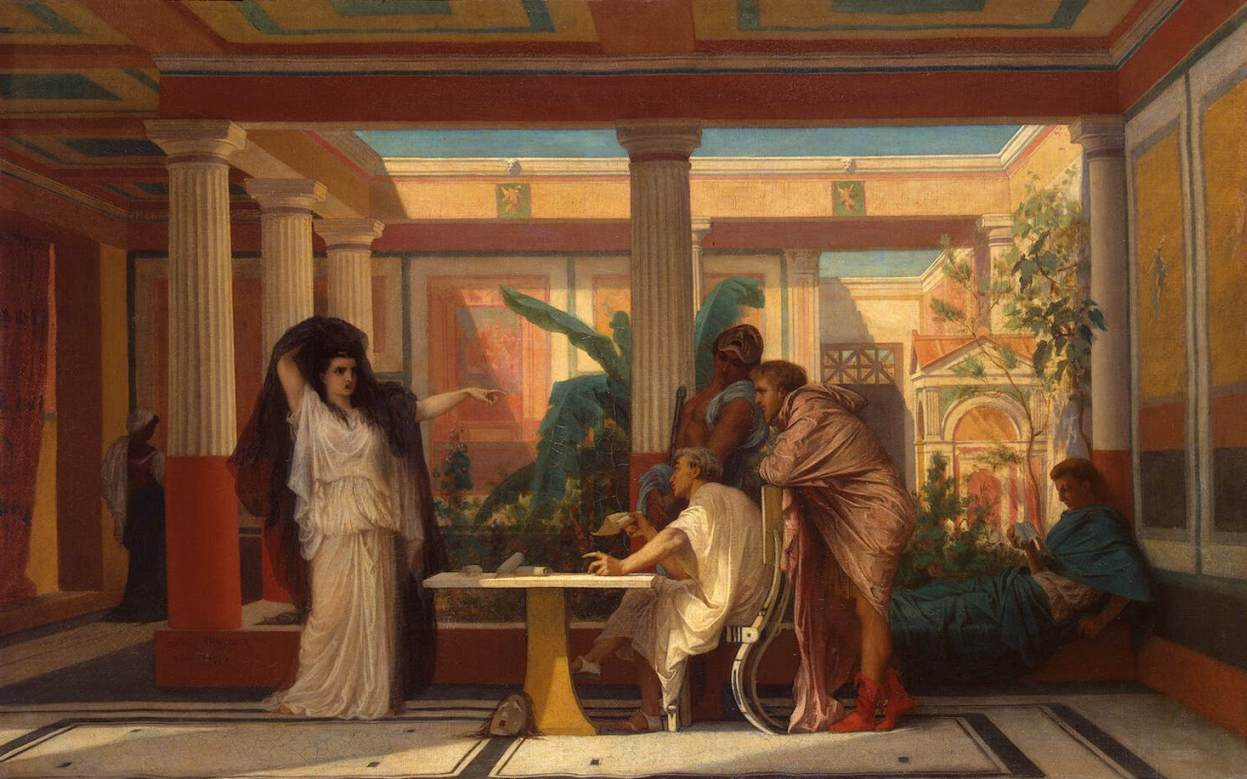
Répétition théâtrale dans la maison d’un poète romain, 1855, Hermitage Museum

The Pompeiian palace was inaugurated on 14 February 1860, in the presence of the Emperor and Empress. Théophile Gautier was present to hear the recitation of his poem written for the occasion, La Femme de Diomède: Prologue. Then famous actors of the Théâtre-Français and the Comedie-Française performed The Flute Player, a play by Emile Augier, a friend of Gautier and the Néo-Grecs.

Boulanger's Répétition théâtrale dans la maison d’un poète romain at the Salon of 1855 played a part in inspiring both the Pompeiian palace and its inauguration with a play. Boulanger was privileged to immortalize the occasion with a work presented at the Salon of 1861, Répétition du "Joueur de flûte" et de la "Femme de Diomède" chez le prince Napoléon (Rehearsal of "The Flute Player" and "Wife of Diomedes" at the Place of Prince Napoléon). The painting depicts not the performance itself but a rehearsal, with only writers, actors, and a Black slave present.

Gautier wrote that the painting "will preserve the memory of a charming spectacle…[The actors] are ancients and moderns at the same time…M. Boulanger was able to merge, with rare spirit and a perfect fit, two apparently irreconcilable elements: the present and past, Paris and Pompeii before the eruption of Vesuvius!…rarely has an ancient pastiche been more successful."

With its synthesis of art, architecture, theatricality, re-enactment, wry humor, and royal patronage, Boulanger's Répétition du "Joueur de flûte" may be seen as the apotheosis of the Néo-Grec aesthetic.

=== The Franco-Prussian War and the Commune ===
When Prussian forces encircled Paris in 1870, Boulanger, like many of the artists who stayed in the city, having neither enlisted in the army nor fled abroad, became a member of the National Guard, joining ranks with his friend Charles Garnier, as well as Edgar Degas, Édouard Manet, Auguste Rodin, and Louis Émile Benassit. He remained in Paris during the brief ascendance and subsequent massacre of the Commune. Boulanger painted a series of works documenting the momentous events. These "visceral battle scenes" full of fire and carnage, quite unlike anything else in his oeuvre, are in the collection of the Musée Carnavalet.

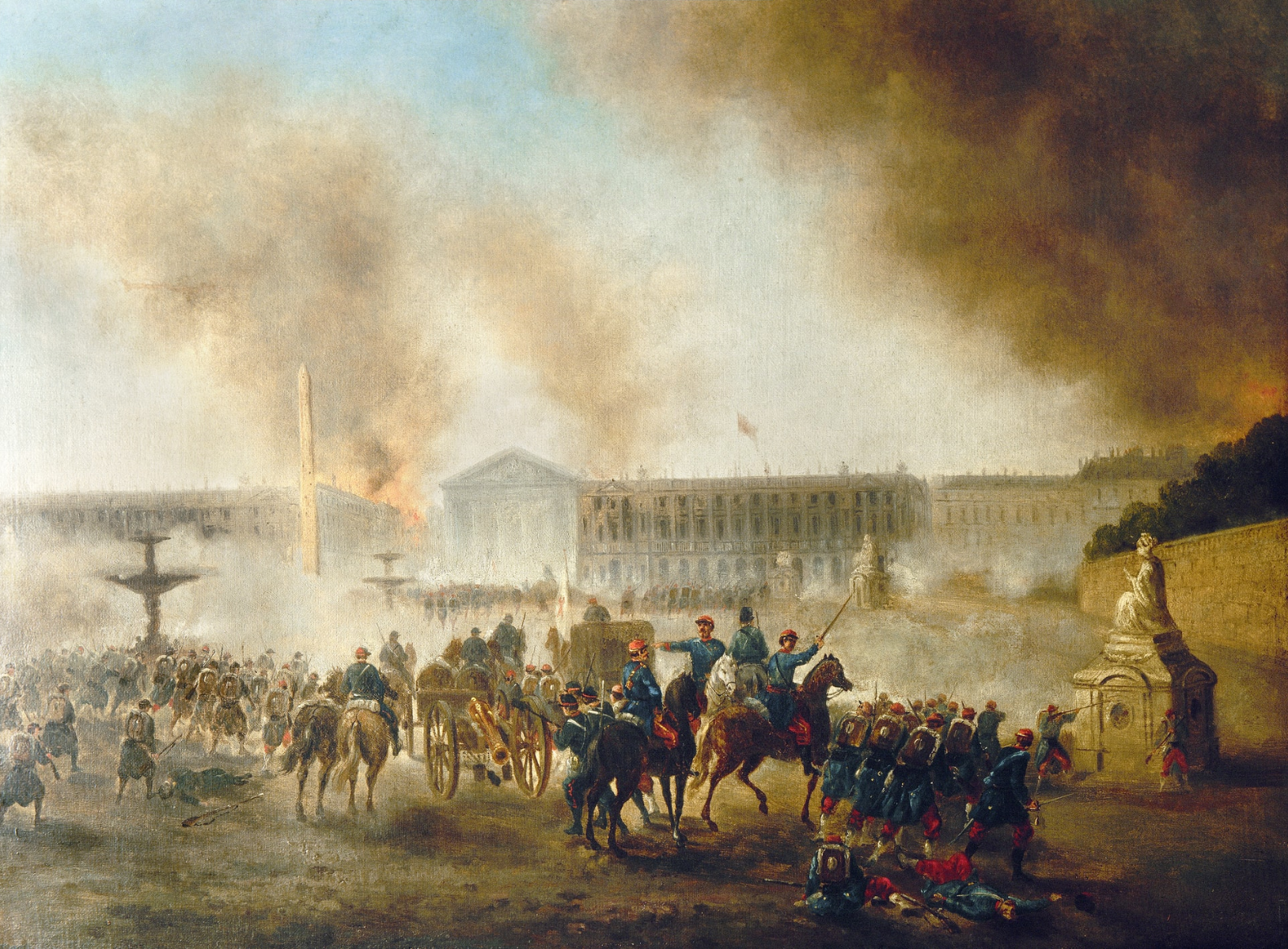
Épisode de la Commune, place de la Concorde, 1871

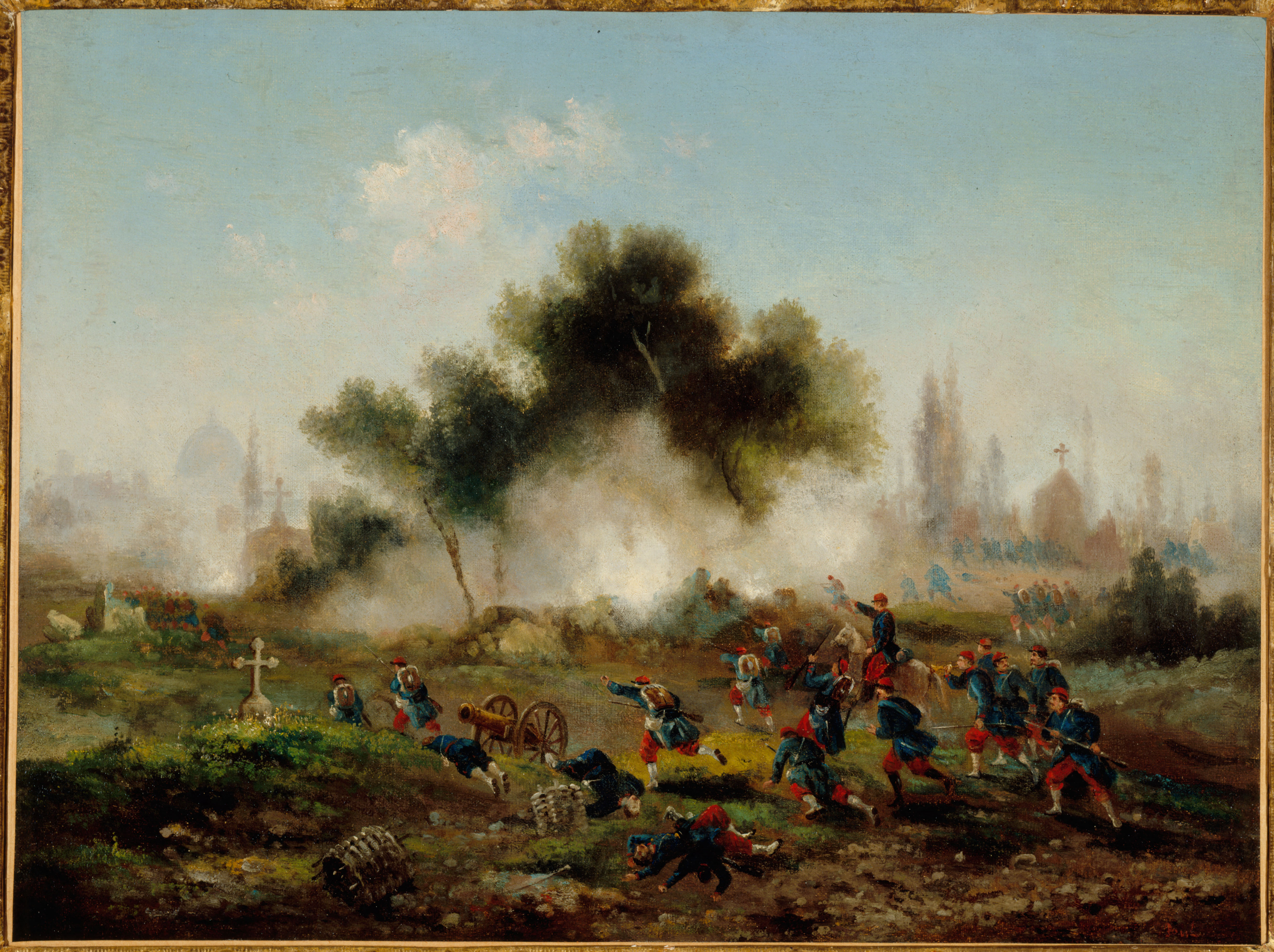
Assaut d'un cimetière par les troupes régulières, mai 1871

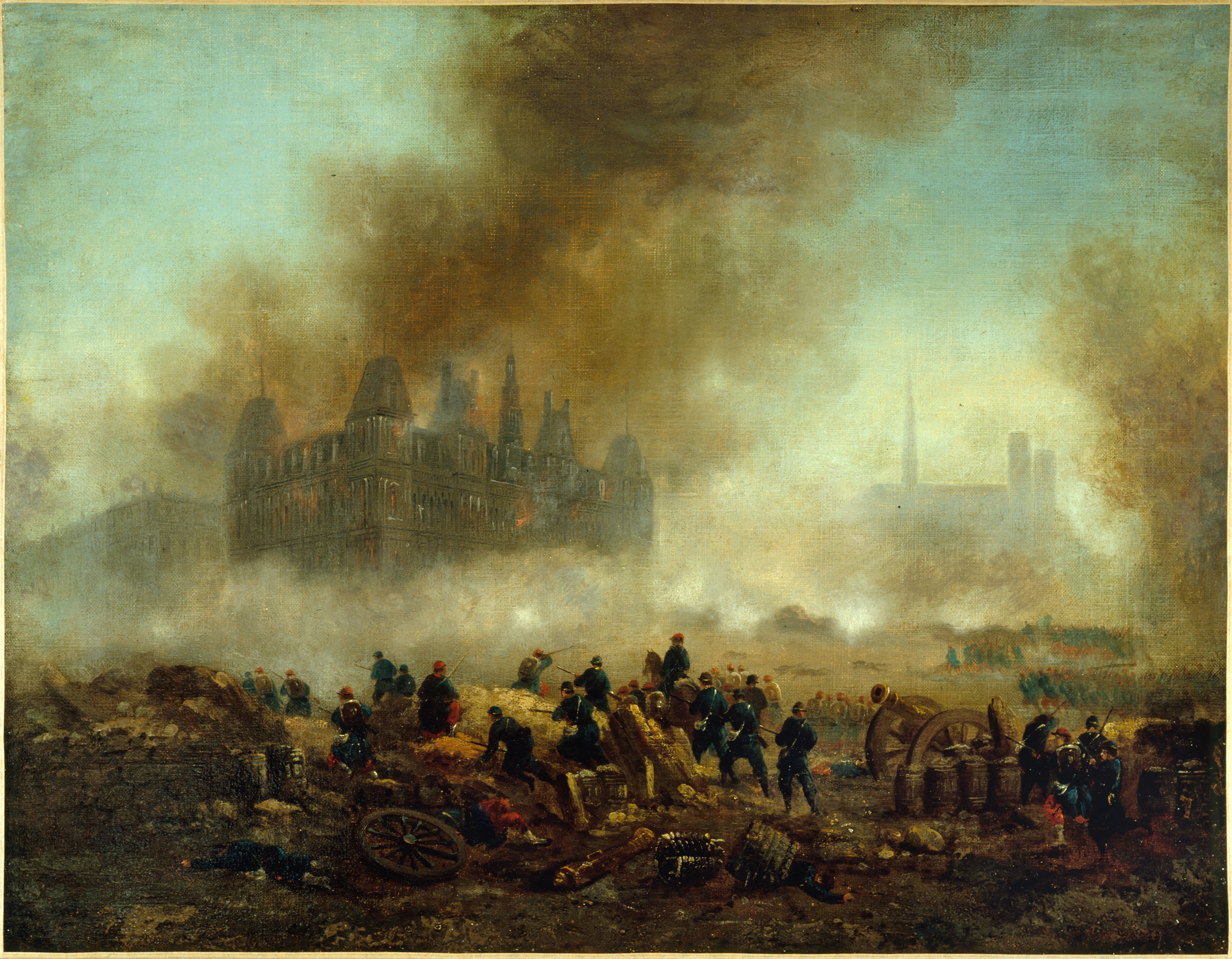
L'Hôtel de Ville incendié, assailli par les troupes de Versailles, 1871

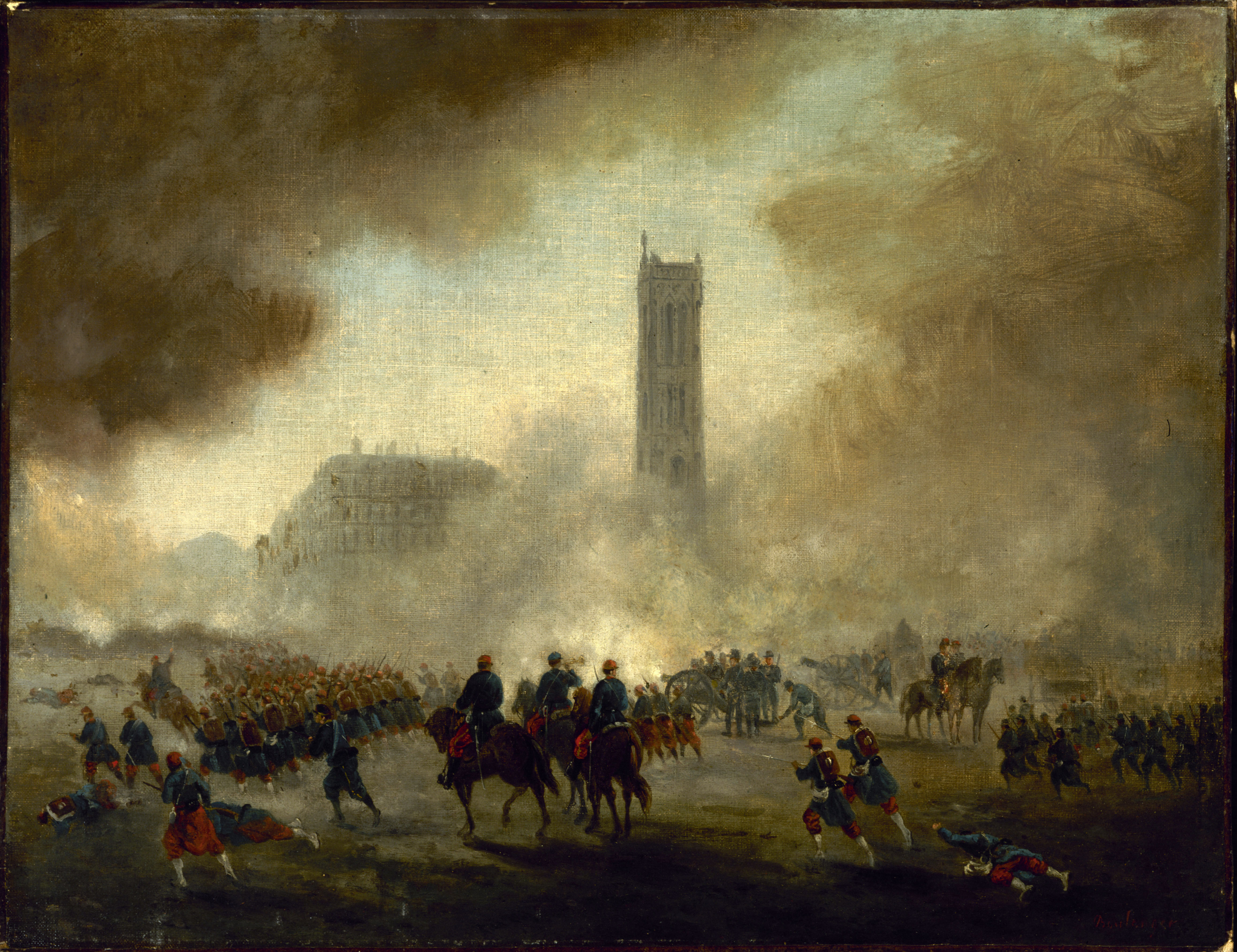
La tour Saint-Jacques, reprise par les troupes versaillaises, 1871

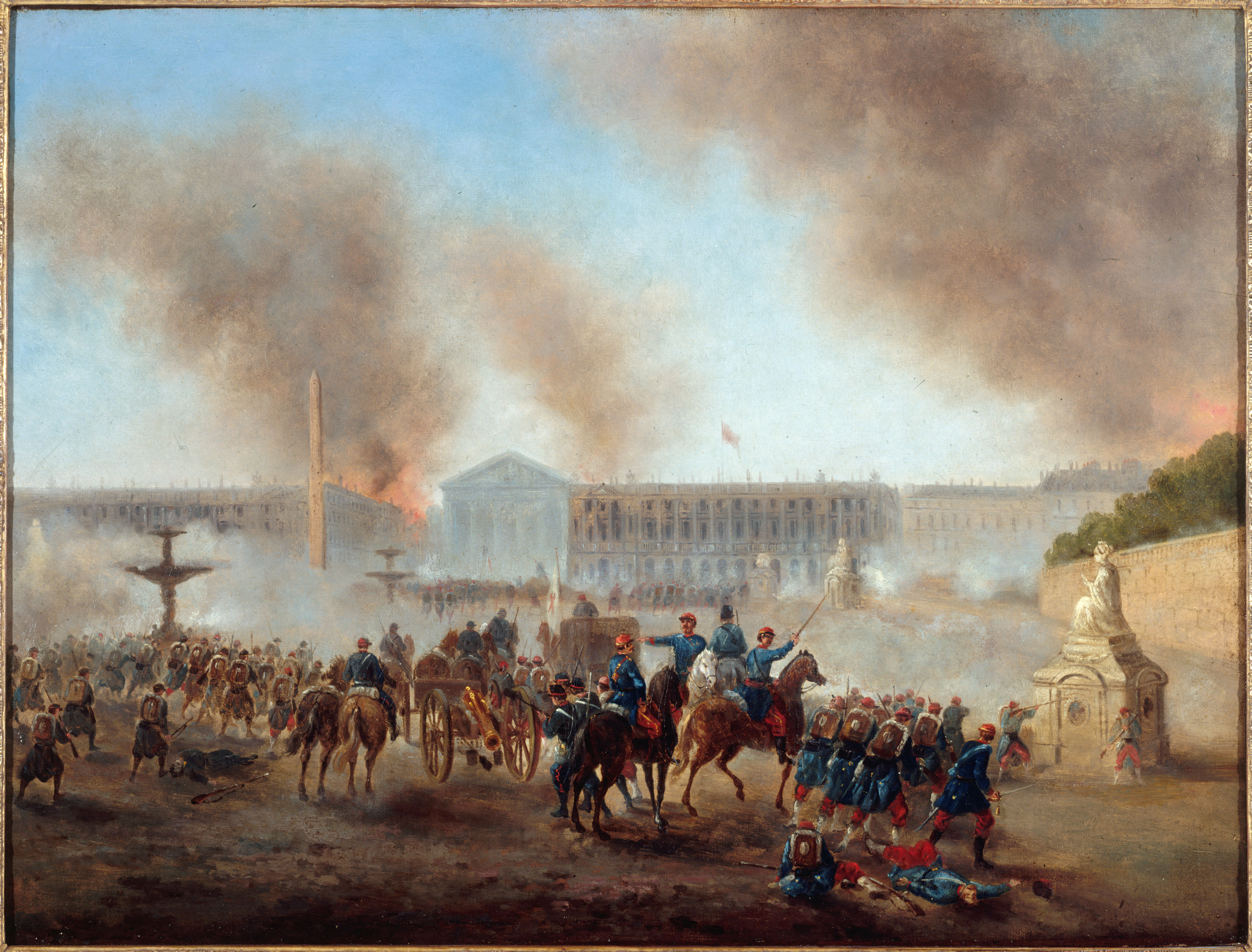
Épisode de la Commune, place de la Concorde, 1871

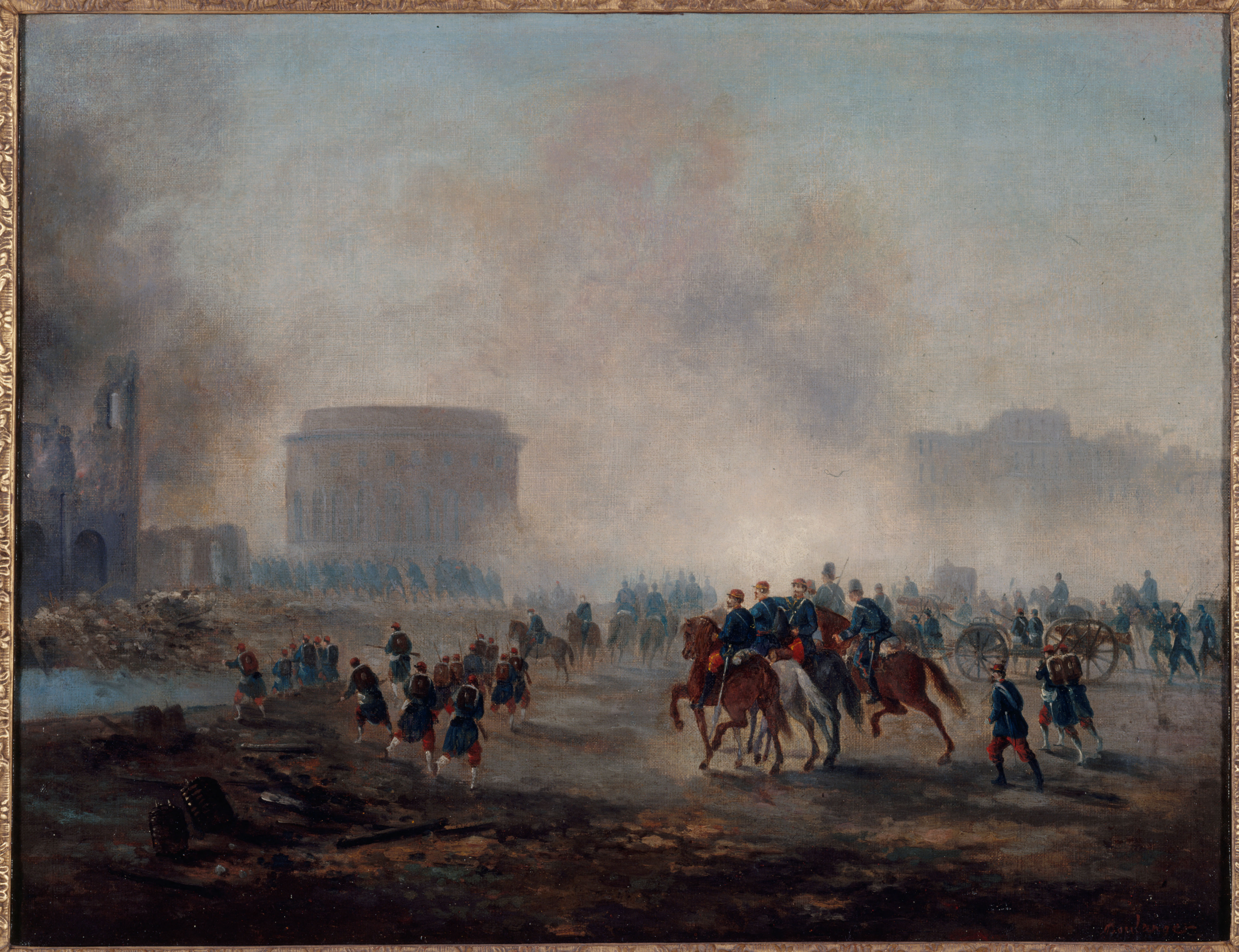
La Rotonde de la Villette cernée par les troupes versaillaises

=== The Classical world ===
Boulanger would continue to evoke the world of the ancient Greeks and Romans throughout his career. Noting his deep research and attention to detail, one critic called him "a scholar at least as much as a virtuoso." Many of these paintings are in private collections, and some are known only from written descriptions or from lithographs or other reproductions of the originals.

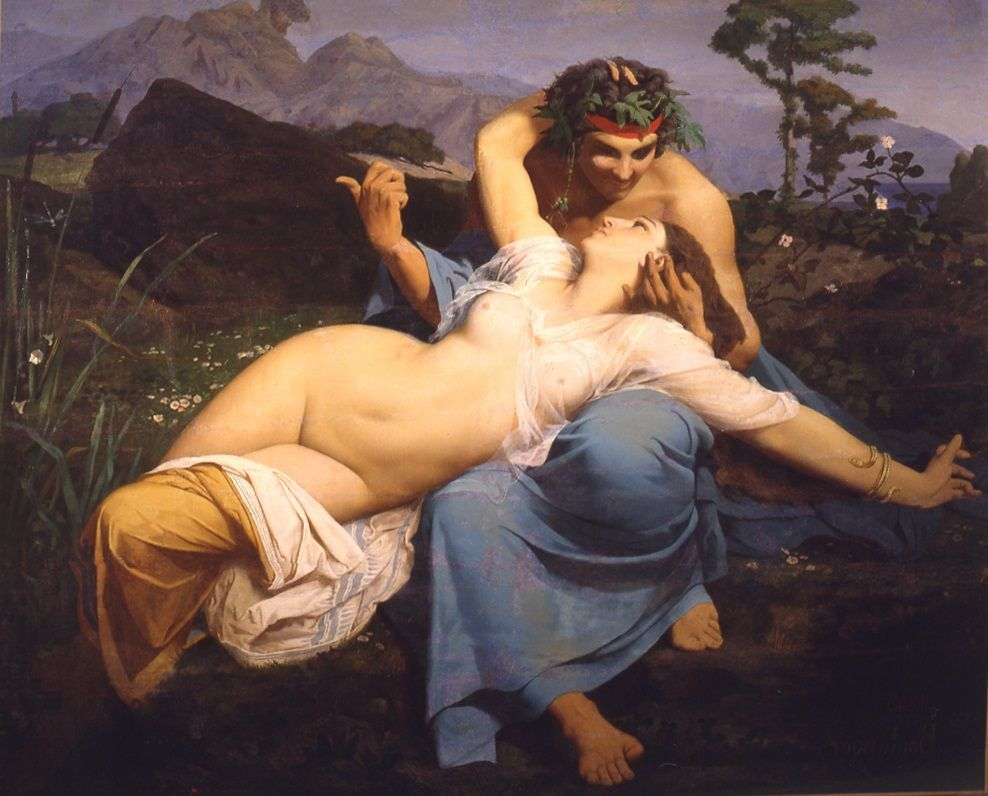
Galathée et le berger Acis, 1848, Musée d'Art et d'Histoire de Narbonne

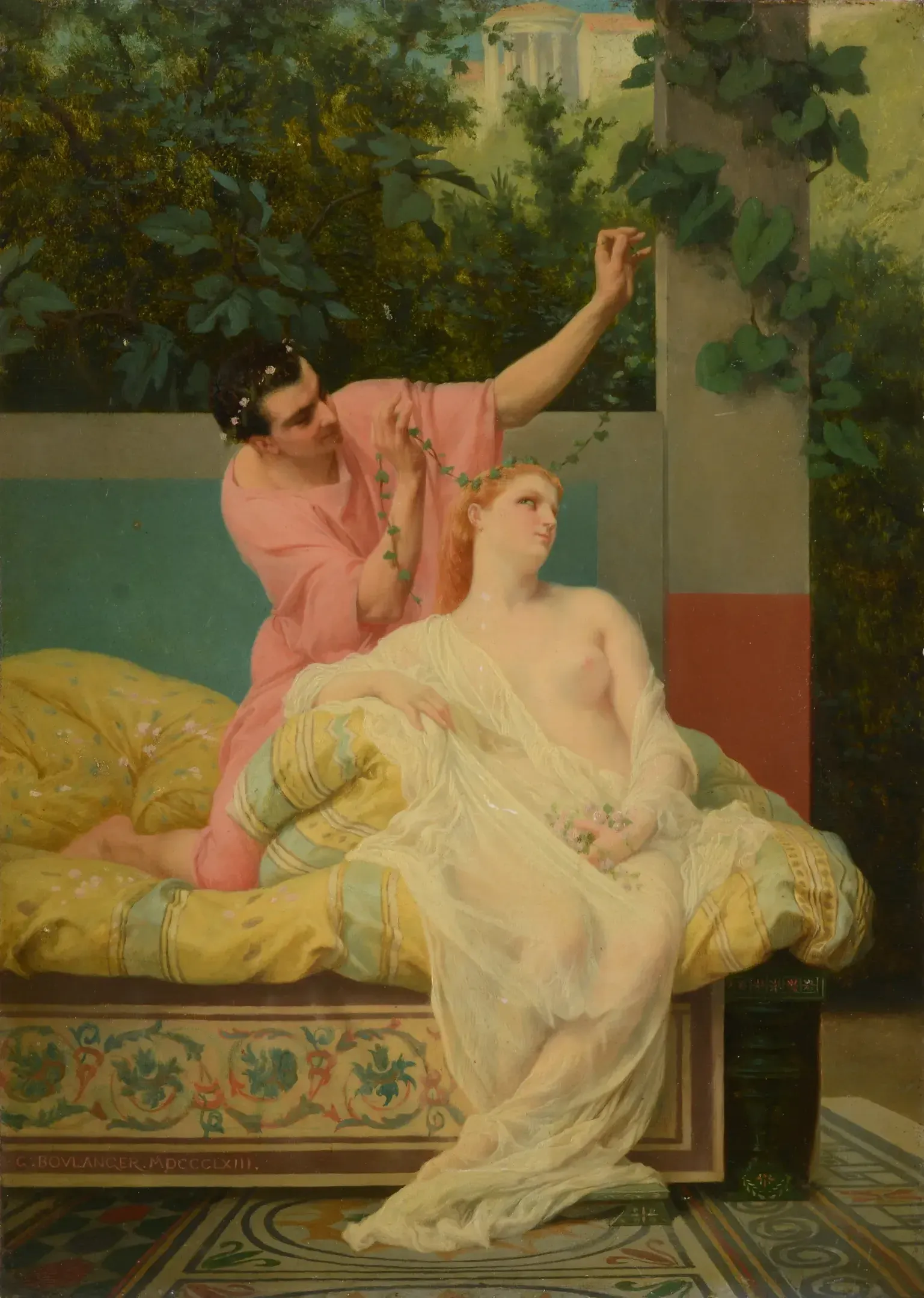
Horace et Lydie, 1863, private collection

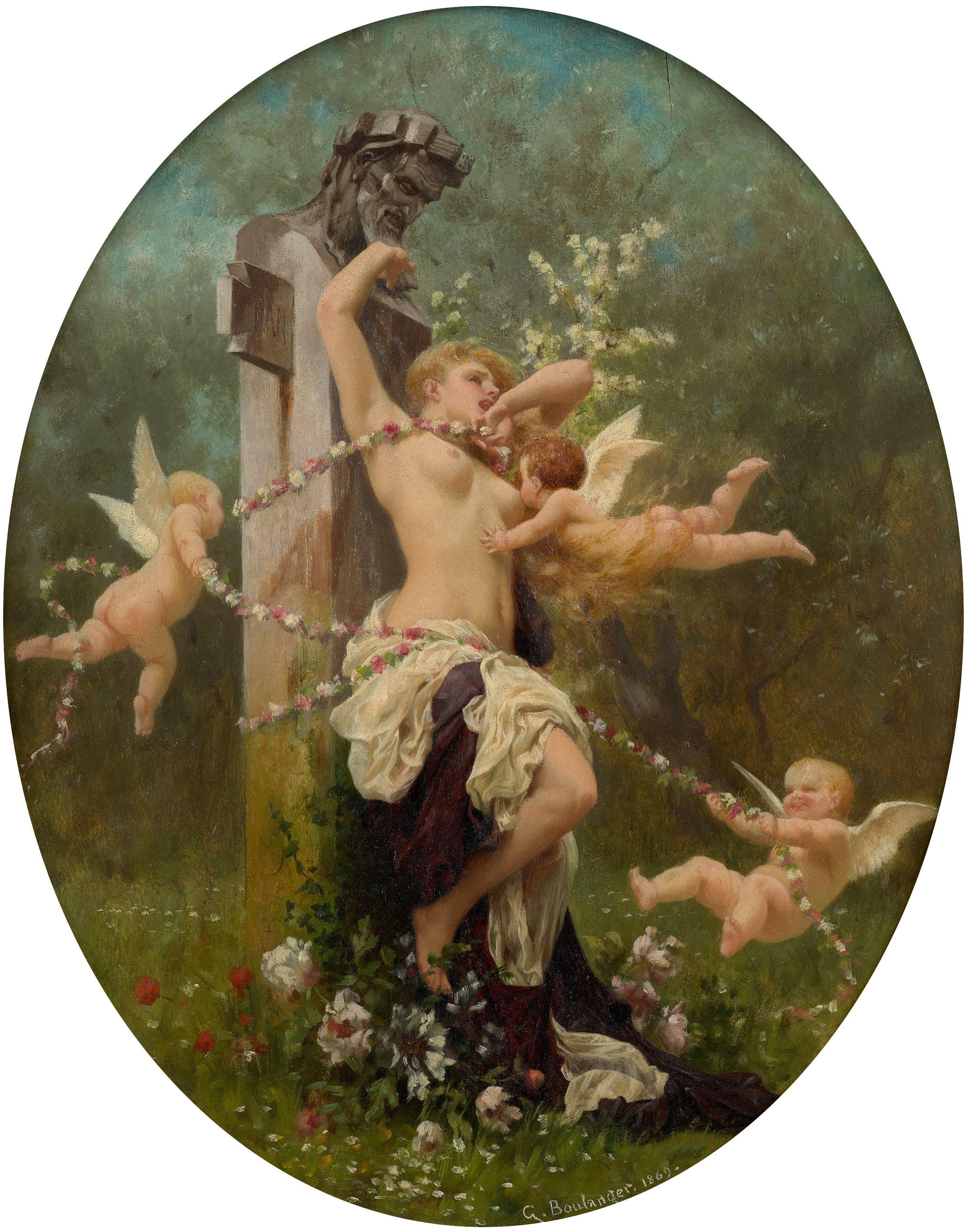
Sacrifice à Pan, 1869, private collection

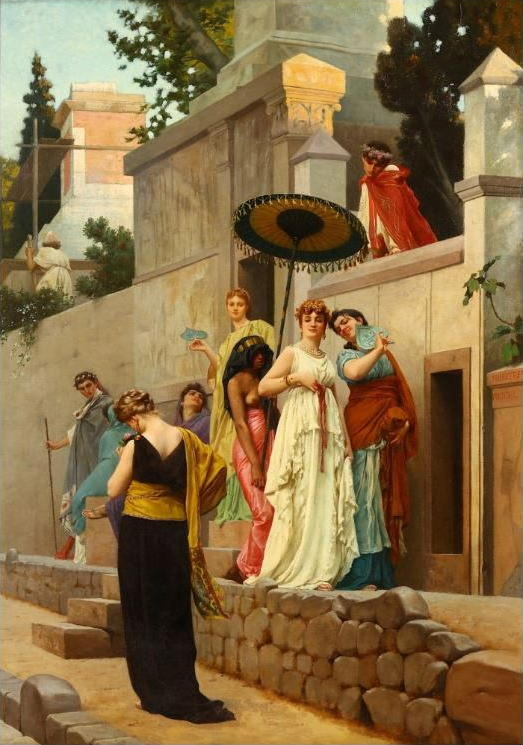
La promenade sure la voie des tombeaux, à Pompei, 1869, private collection

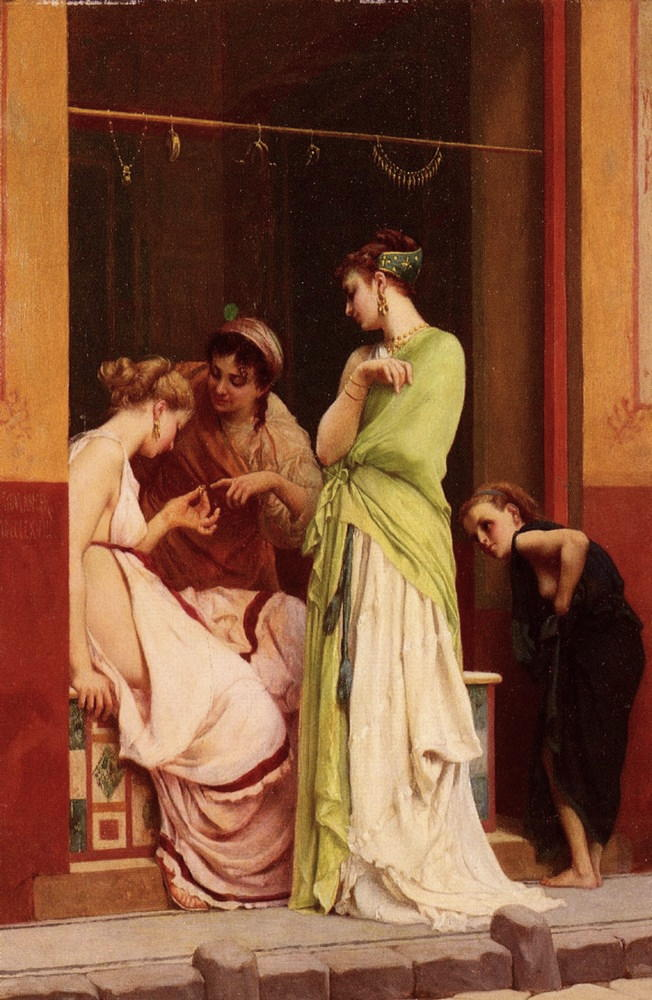
Une marchande de bijoux a Pompéi, 1868, private collection

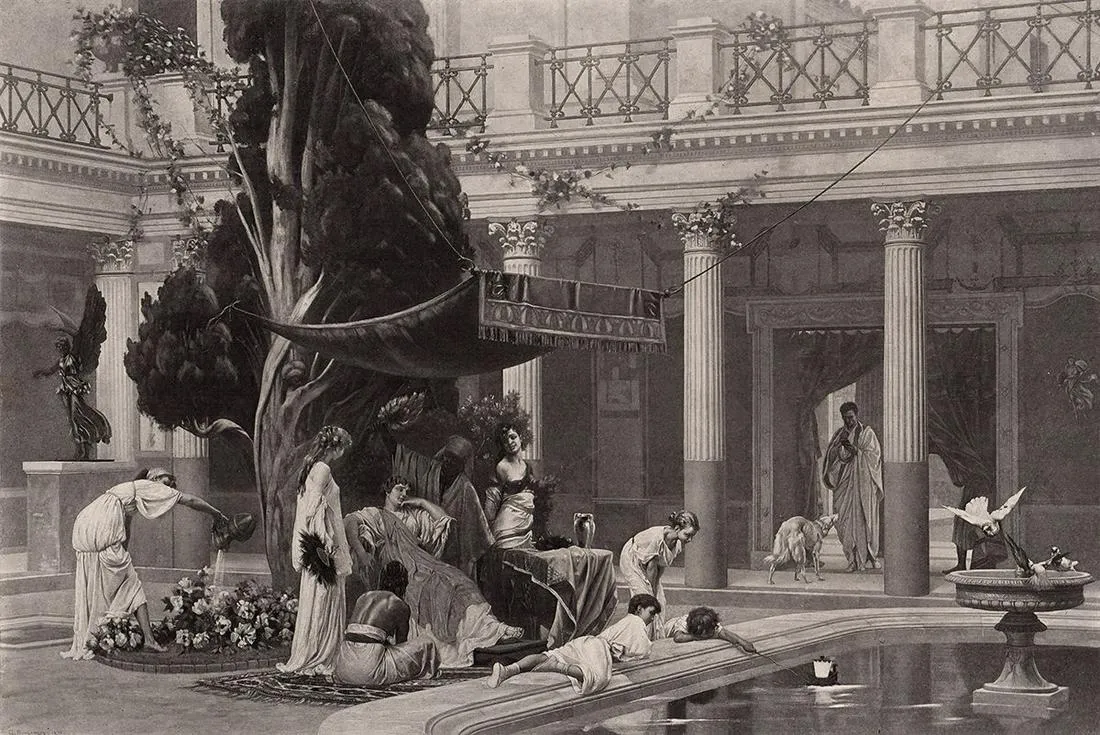
Gynaeceum, heliogravure after the painting of 1875

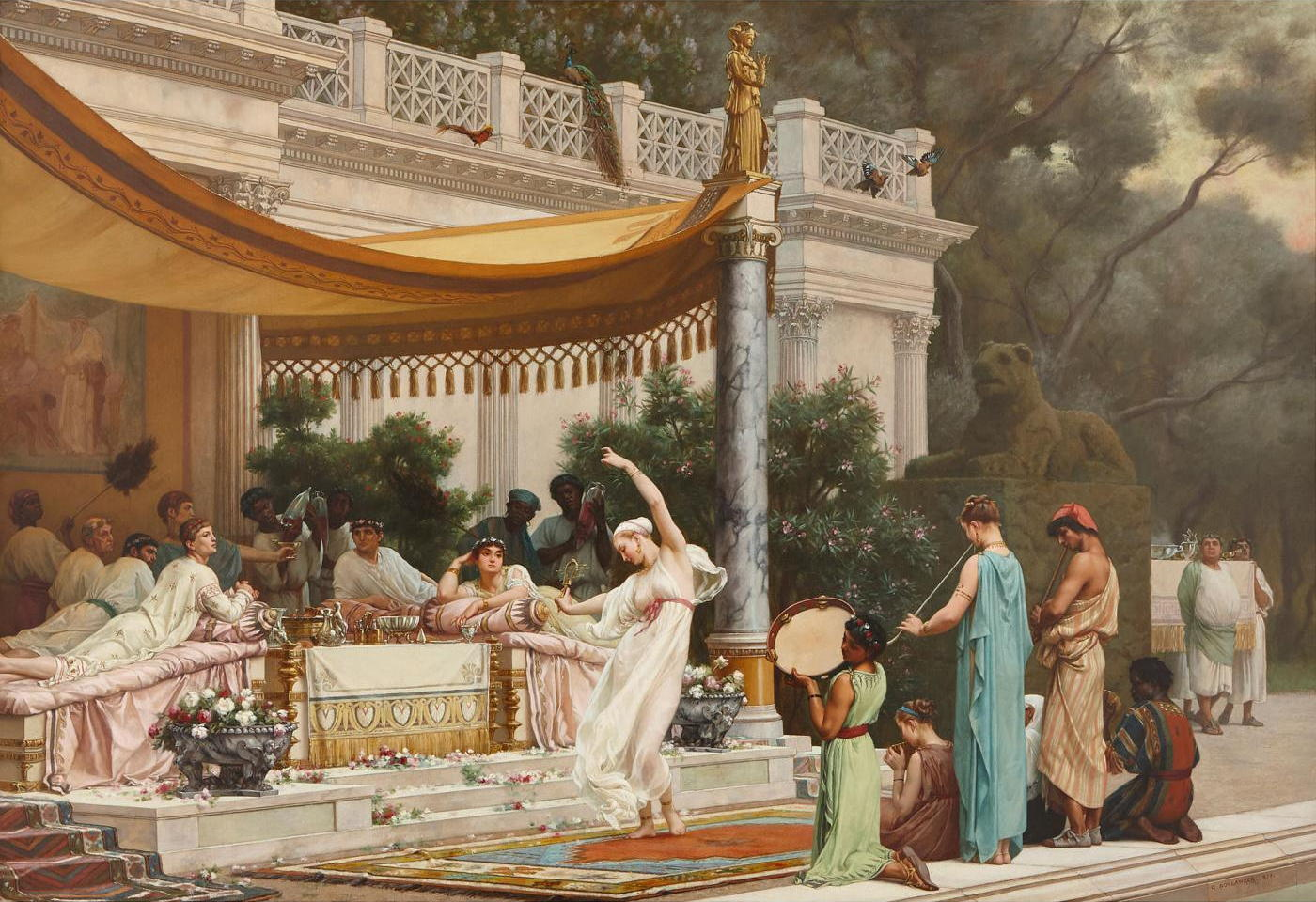
Un repas chez Lucullus; Triclinium d’été, 1877, private collection

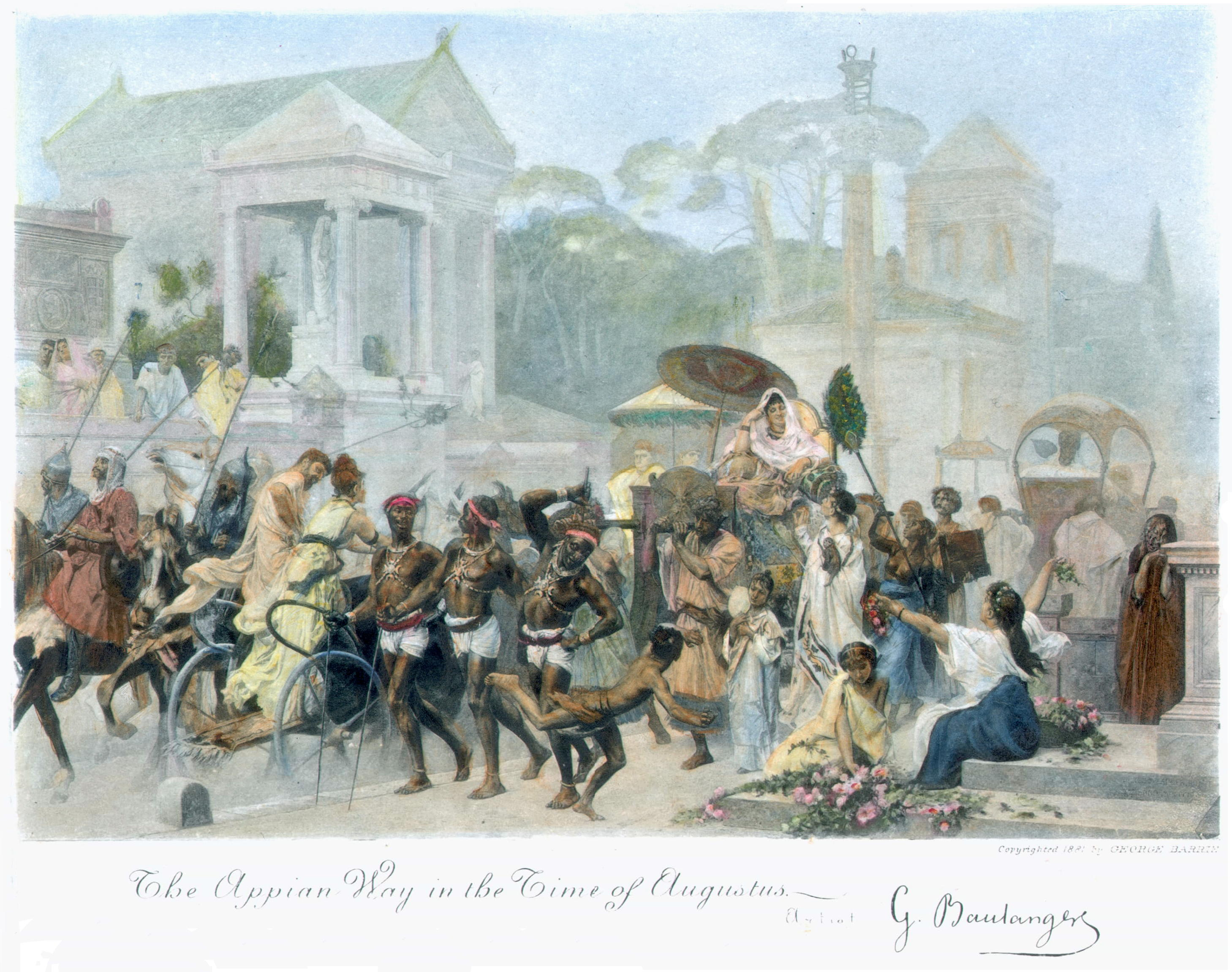
La Via Appia au temps d'Auguste, colored reproduction by George Barrin of the painting of 1874

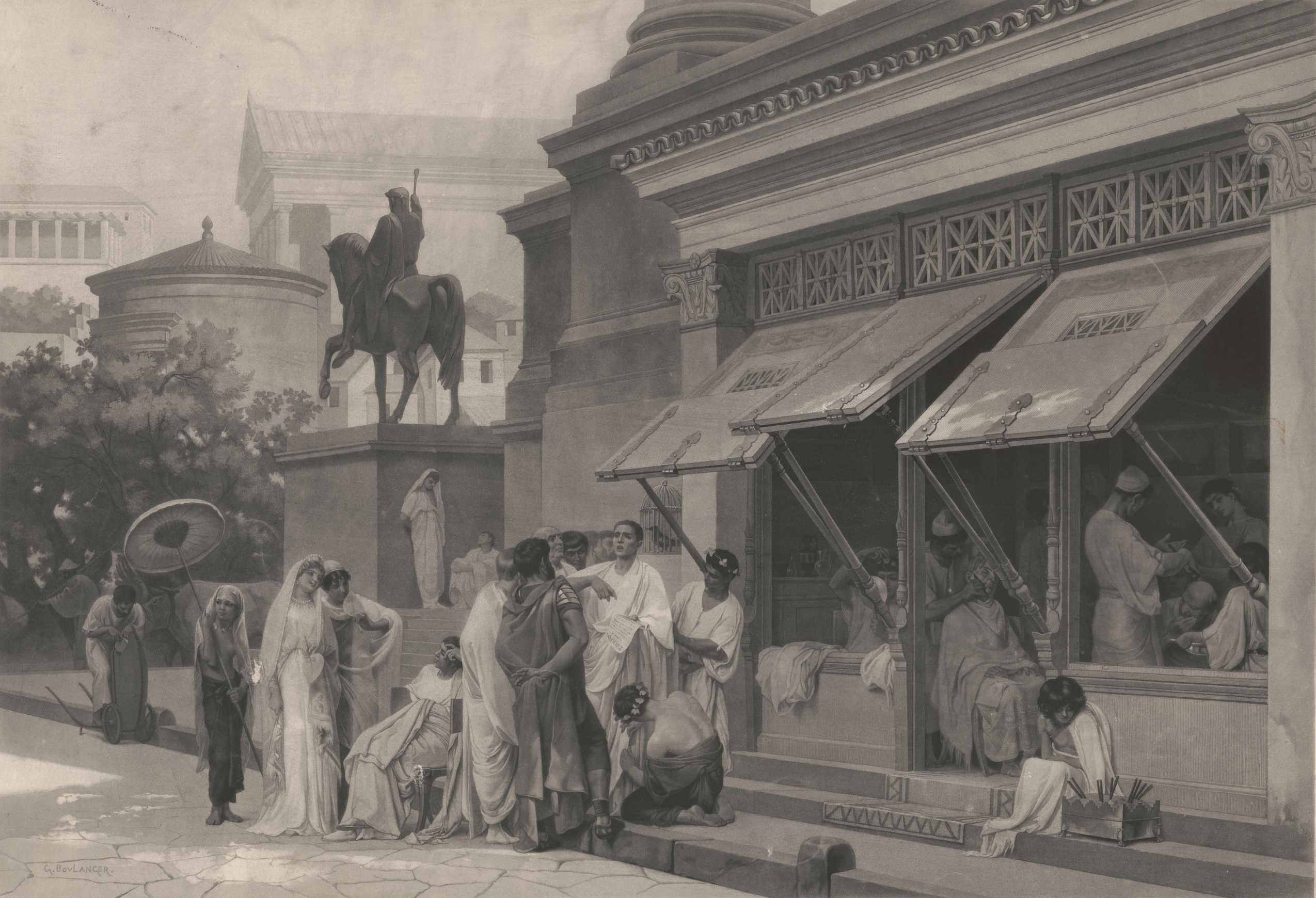
La boutique du barbier Licinius, engraving by Gautier, 1885

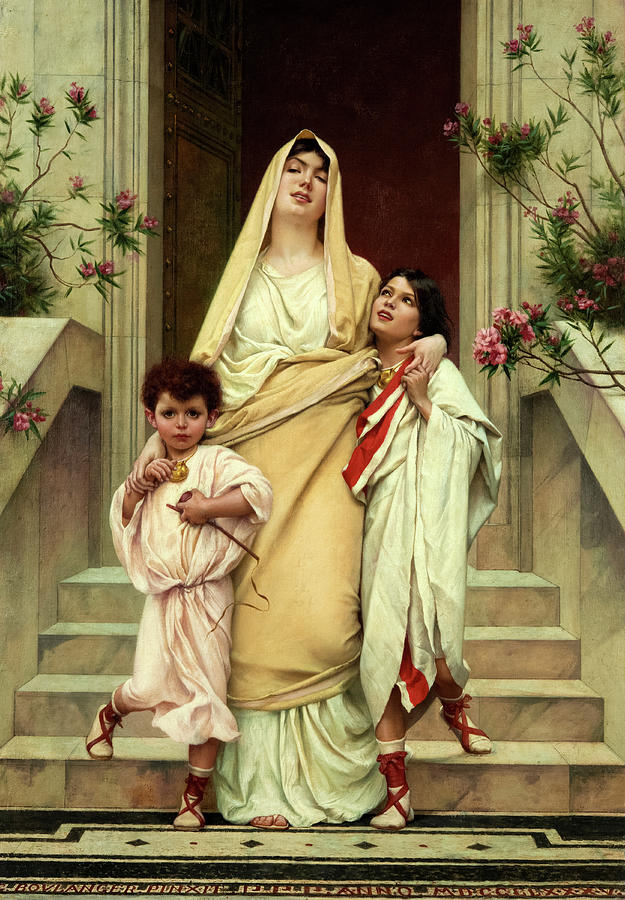
Mother of the Gracchi, 1885

=== Orientalist art ===
Like his friend Gérôme, Boulanger would also paint Orientalist subjects throughout his career, drawing inspiration from his travels in North Africa.

…Africa had opened up new horizons for him, had stirred in him unforgettable emotions, but had not thrown him into the great current into which Delacroix was to venture and from which, with his marvelous genius, Delacroix was to emerge unharmed. Gustave Boulanger brought back the brilliance of the Orient in his eye rather than in his thought. He dreamed of a quieter Orient, with broad lines, fine types, gently pleated draperies; an Orient with the sky of Greece.

Marie-Madeleine Aubrun sees in the artist's Orientalist works, as in his ancient world paintings, "his quest for an elsewhere" and "his attempt to apprehend the different."

Because museums preferred to collect his Classical subjects, Boulanger's Orientalist works were for a long time less well known, but in the 21st-century art market they are more sought after and bring higher prices.

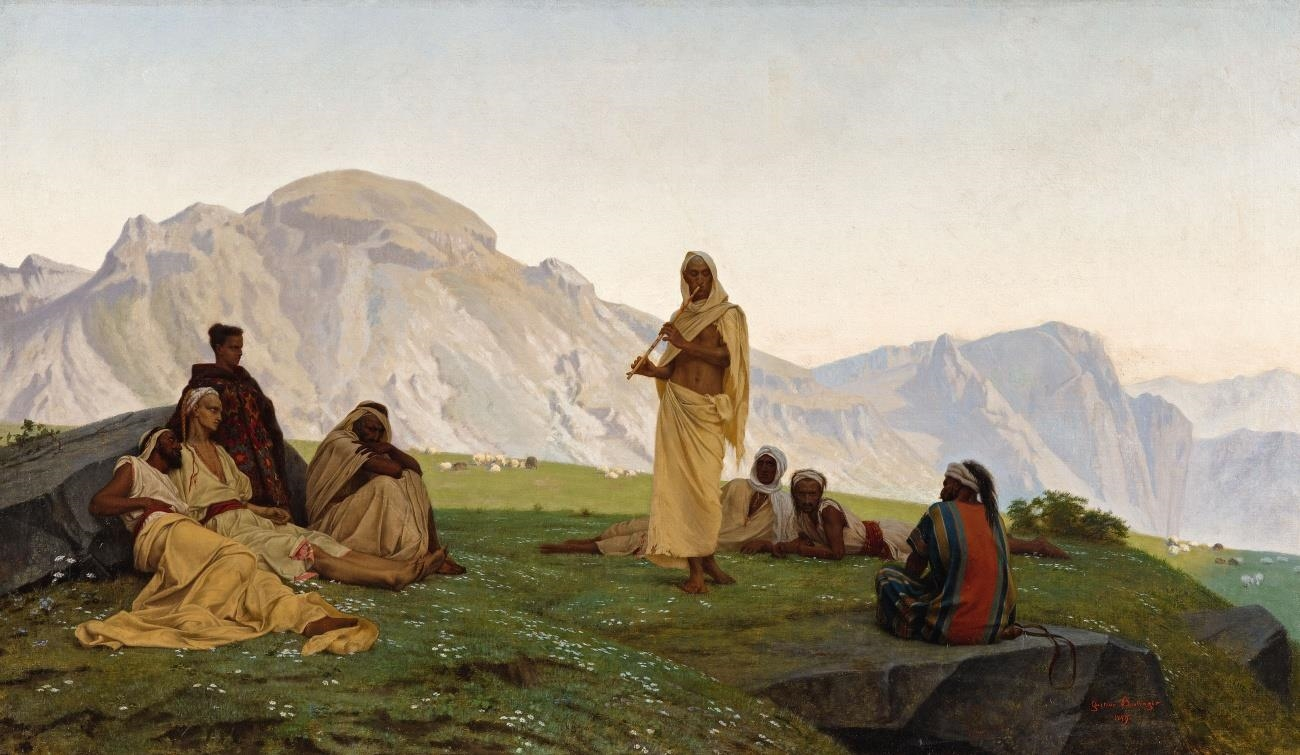
A Bedouin Musician, 1859, private collection

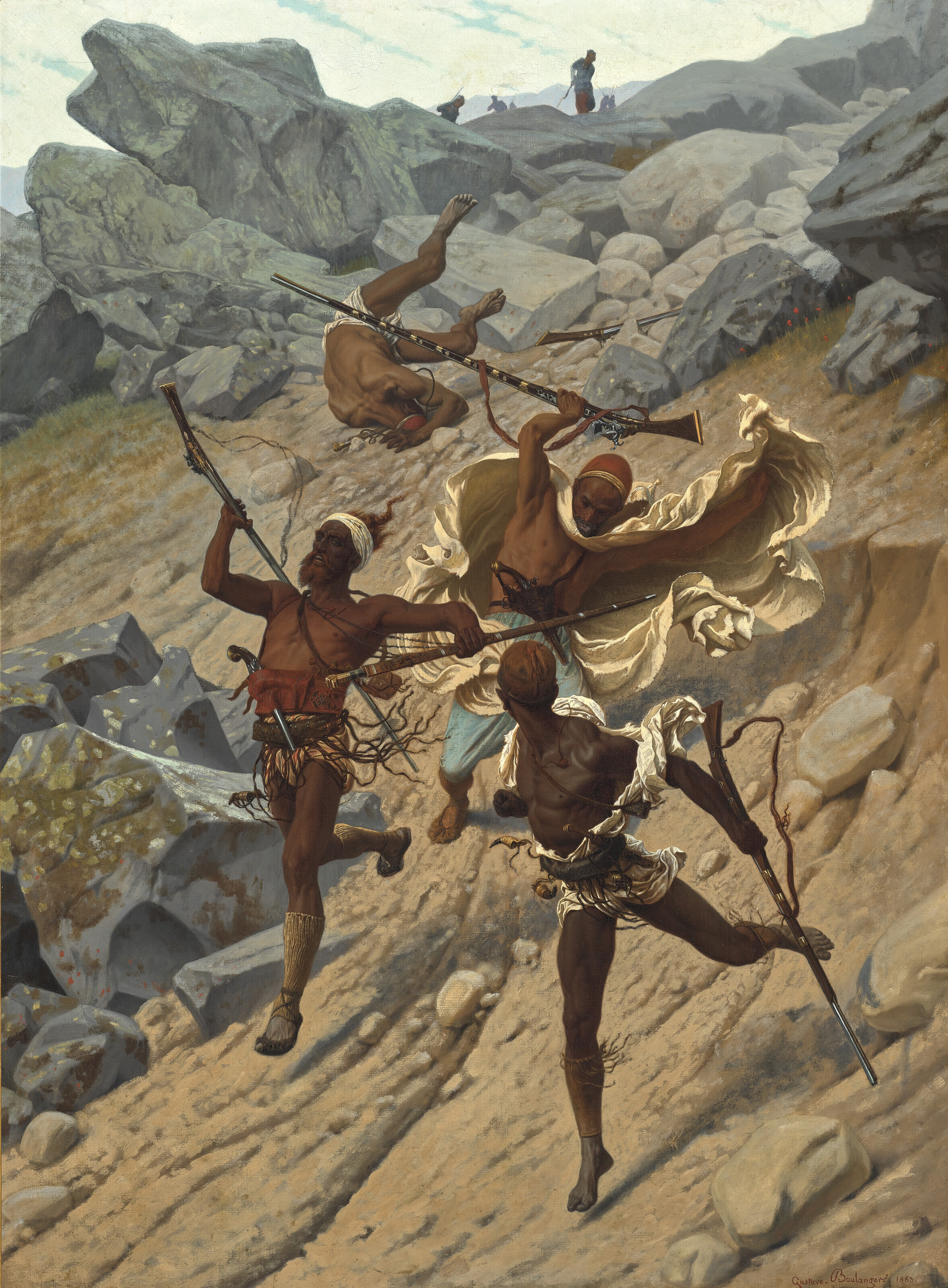
La déroute des Kabyles, 1863, private collection

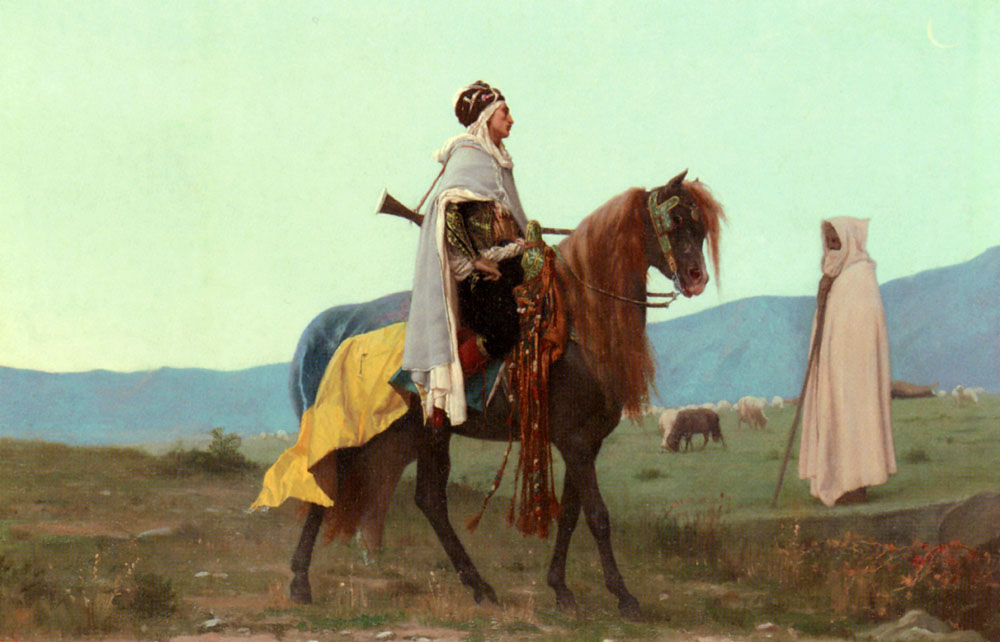
Djeid et Rahia, 1865, private collection

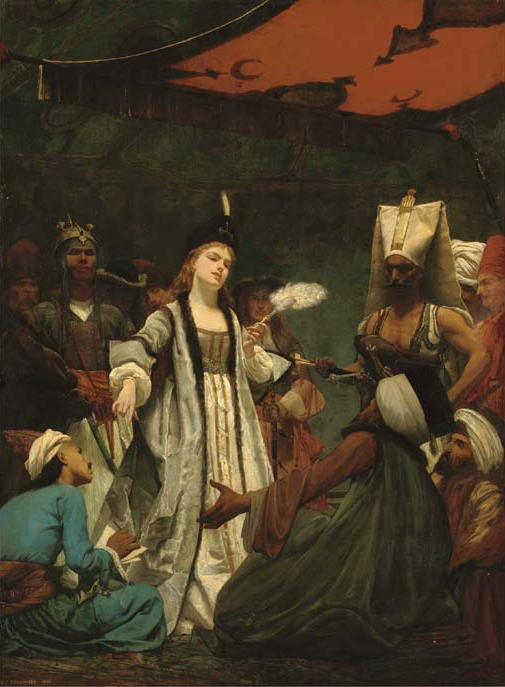
Catherine I Negotiating the Treaty of Prut, 1866, private collection

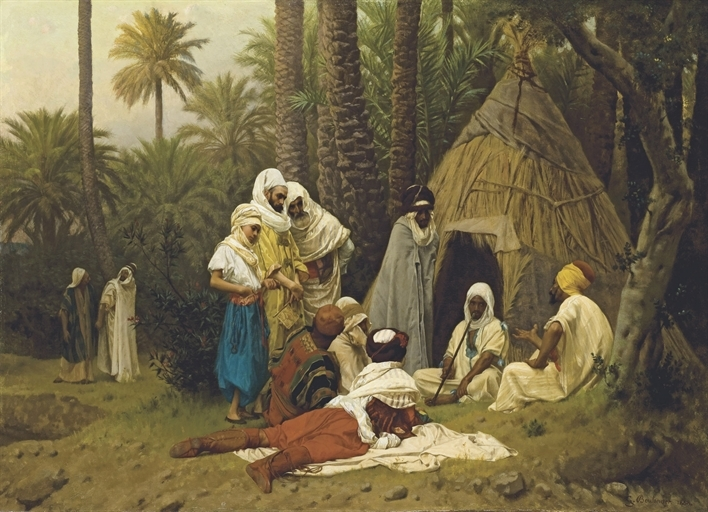
El Hiasseub, Conteur Arabe, 1868, private collection

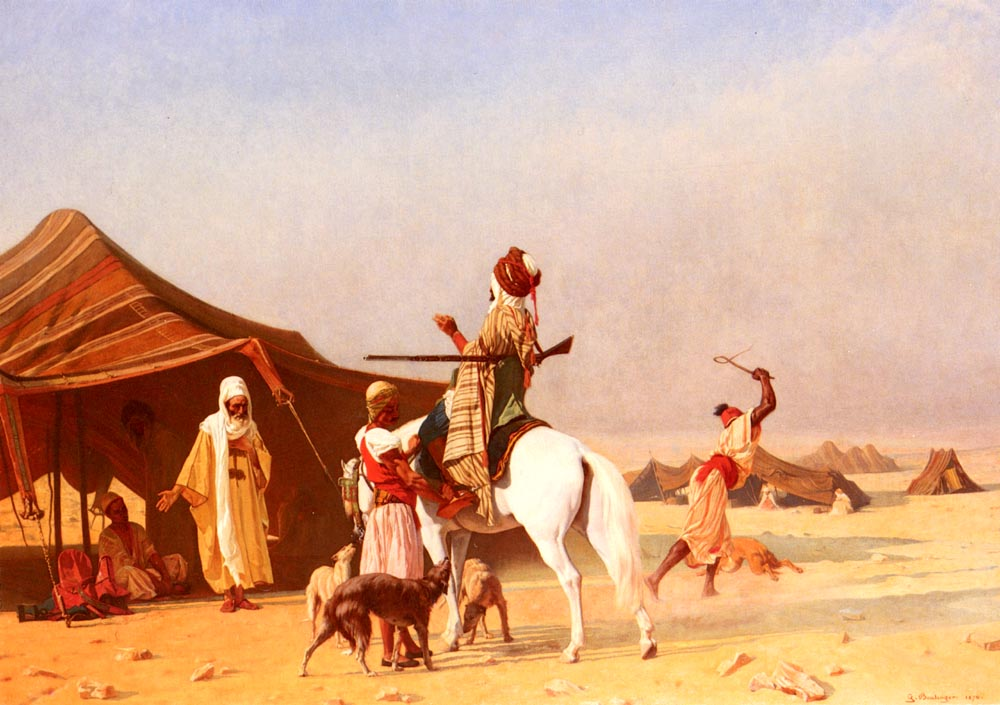
Title unknown, 1870, private collection

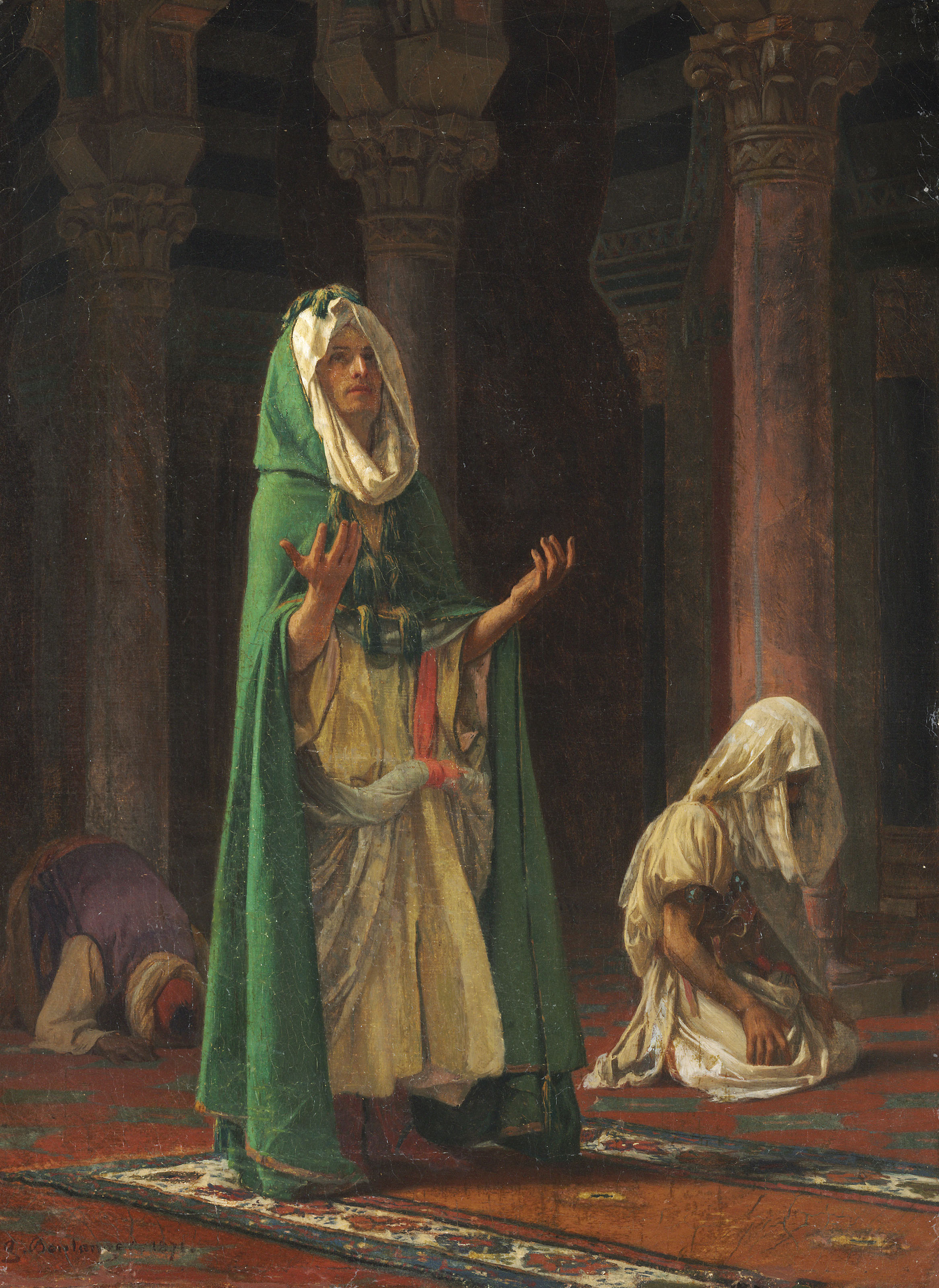
La Prière, 1871, private collection

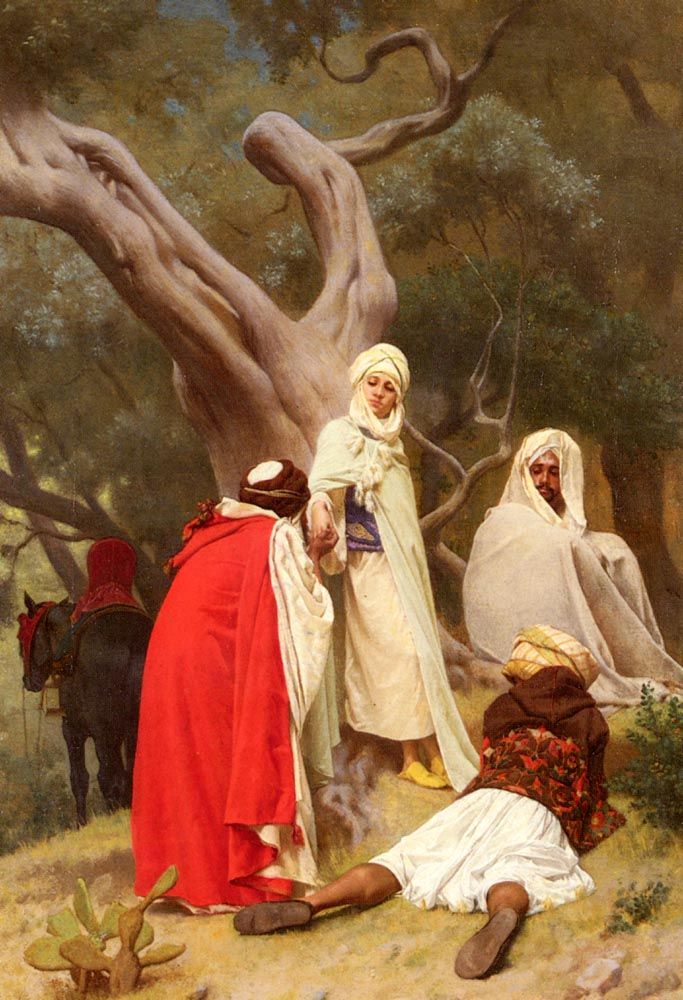
Reception Of An Emir, 1871, private collection

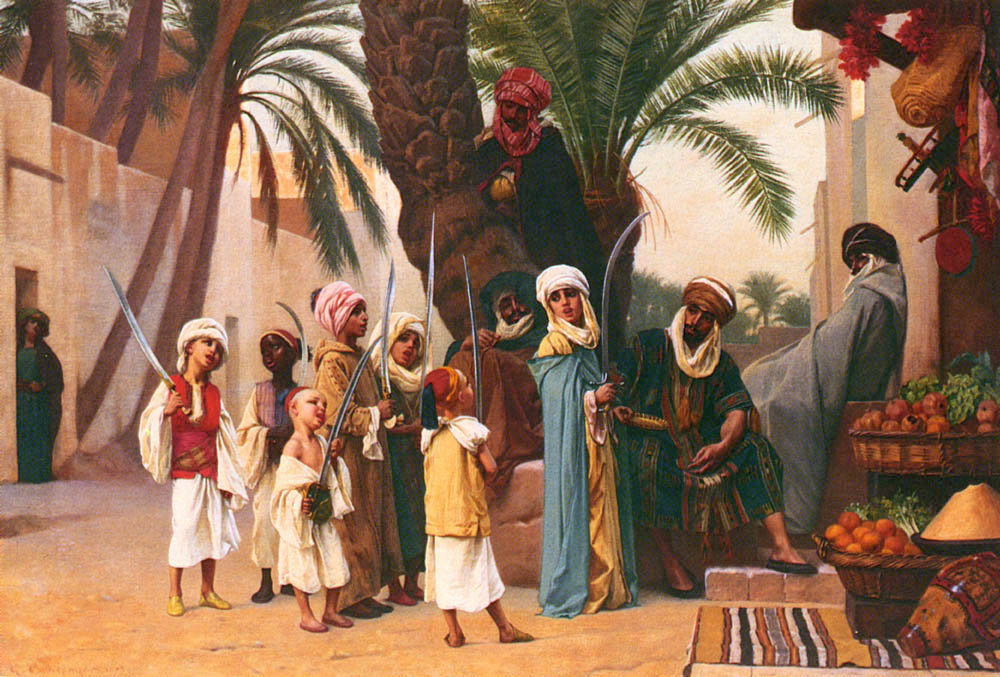
La quête de l'Aïd-Srir, à Biskra, 1873, private collection

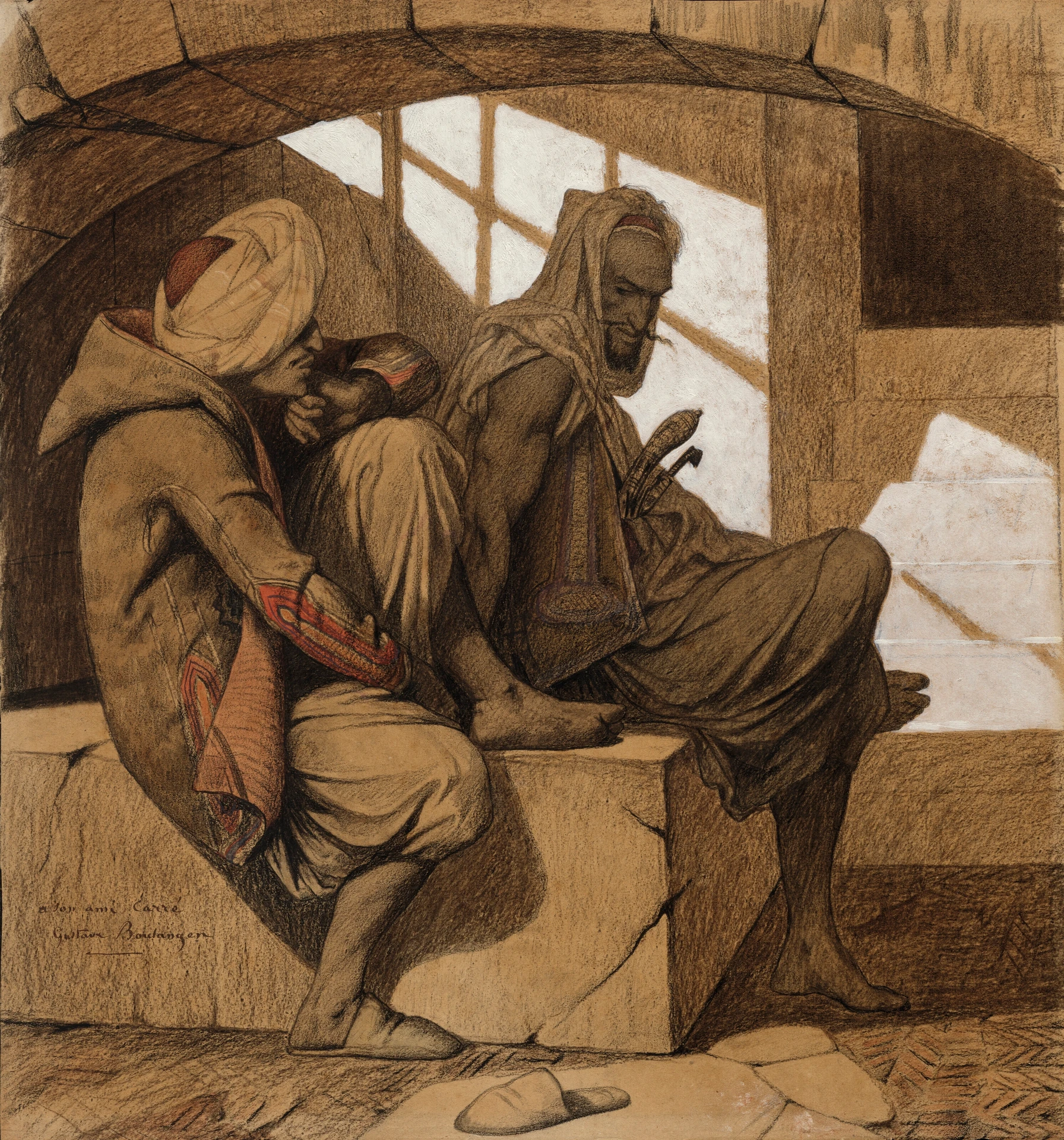
Deux arabes assis, undated, private collection

=== Portraits and character studies ===
Though less known for his portraiture, Boulanger painted and drew portraits throughout his career.

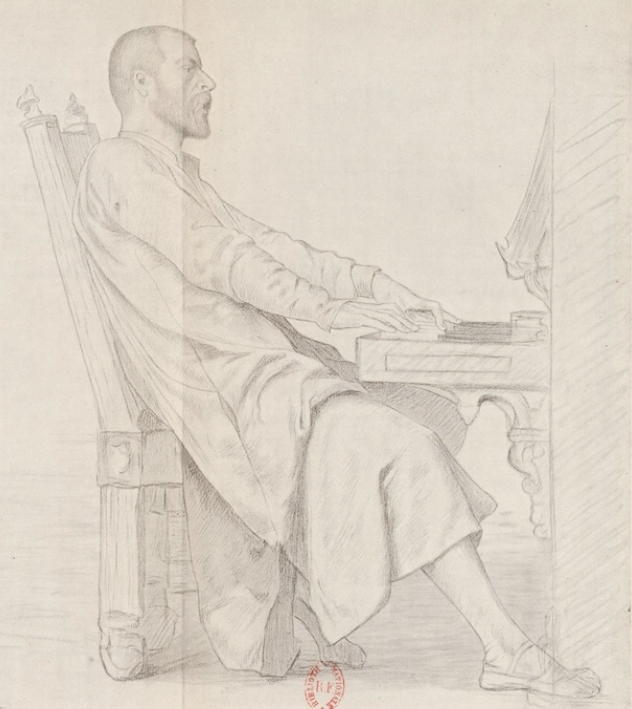
Edmond Membrée, c. 1849-1850

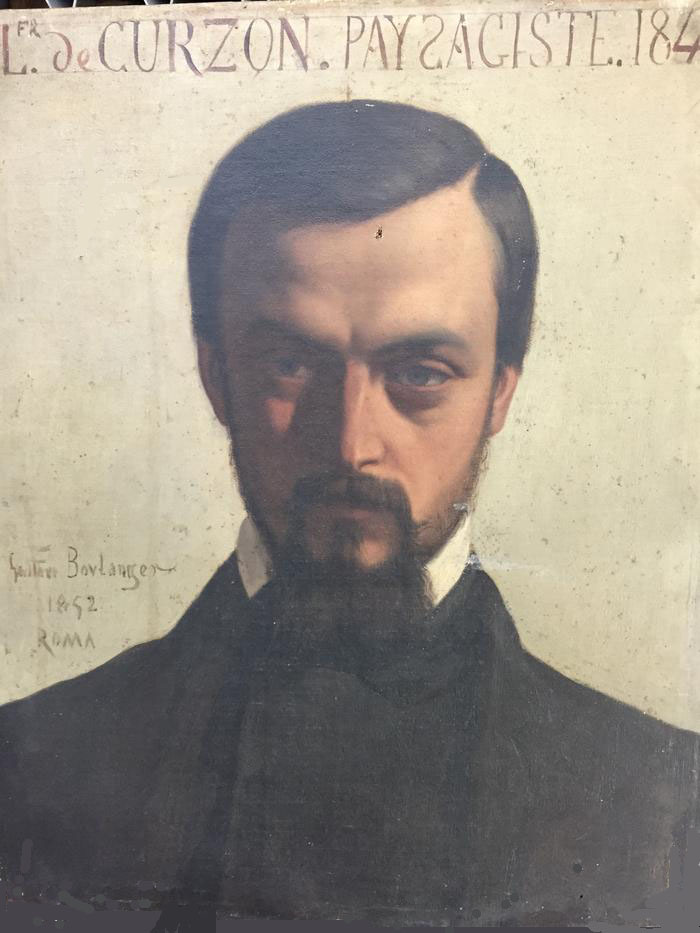
Alfred de Curzon, 1852, Villa Medici

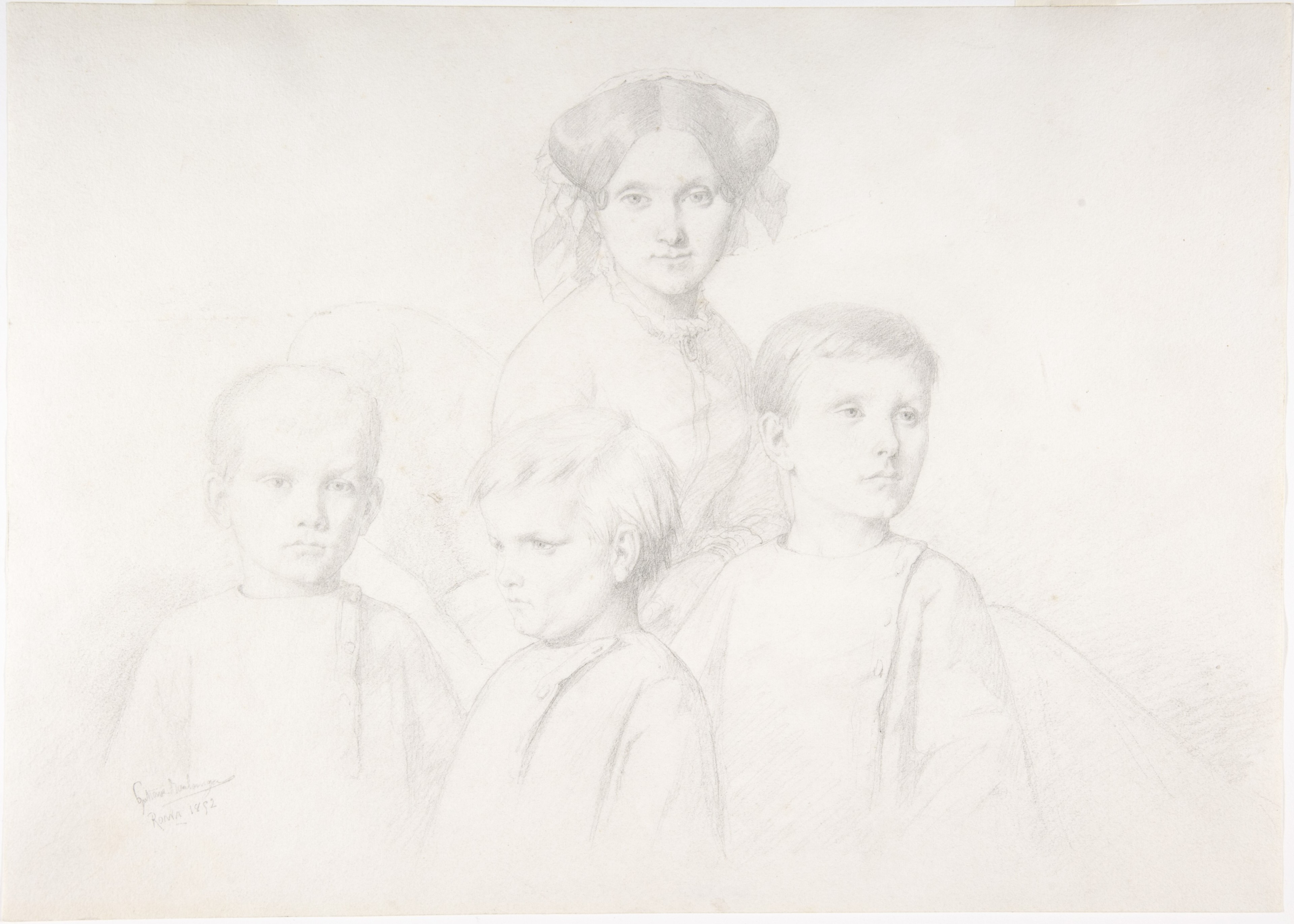
Woman and three children, 1852, Metropolitan Museum

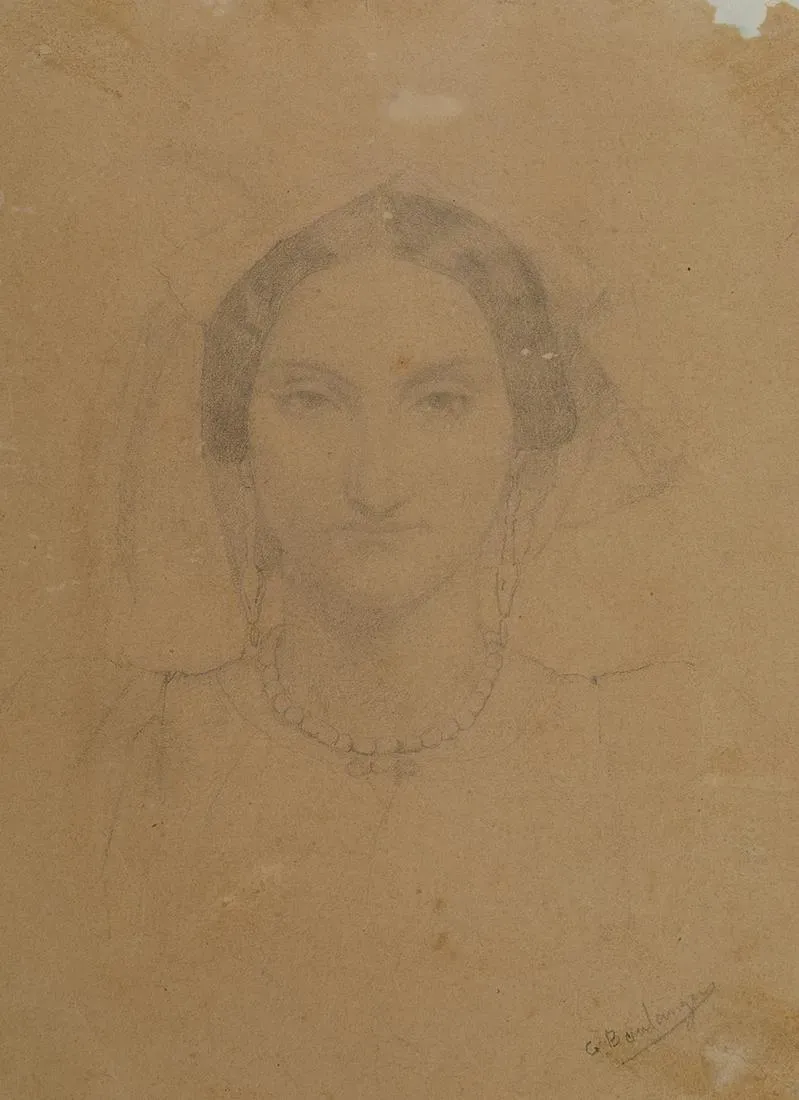
study for Tête d'Italienne, 1854, private collection

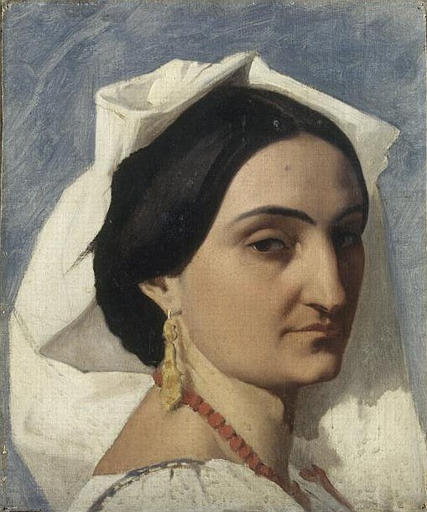
Tête d’Italienne, 1854, Musée des Beaux-Arts de Valenciennes

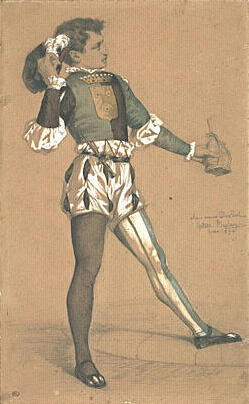
Camille du Locle, 1854, Musée du Louvre

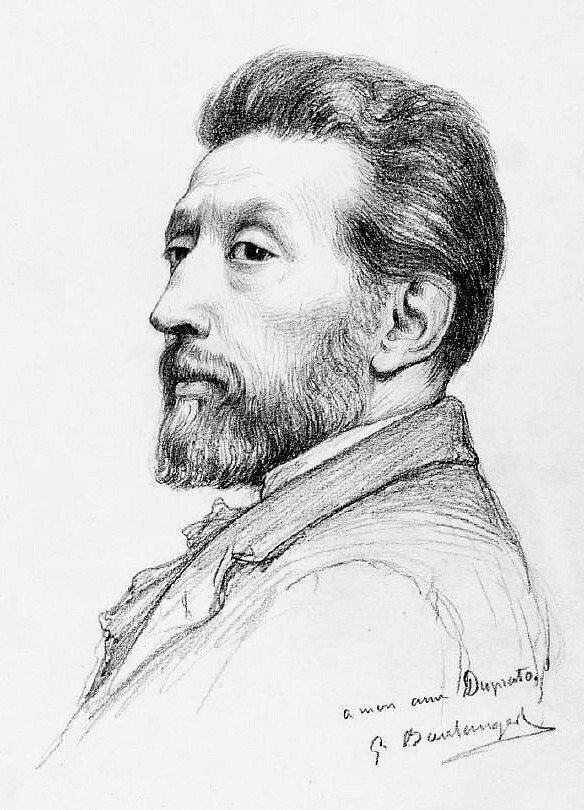
Jules Duprato, 1856, Bibliothèque nationale de France

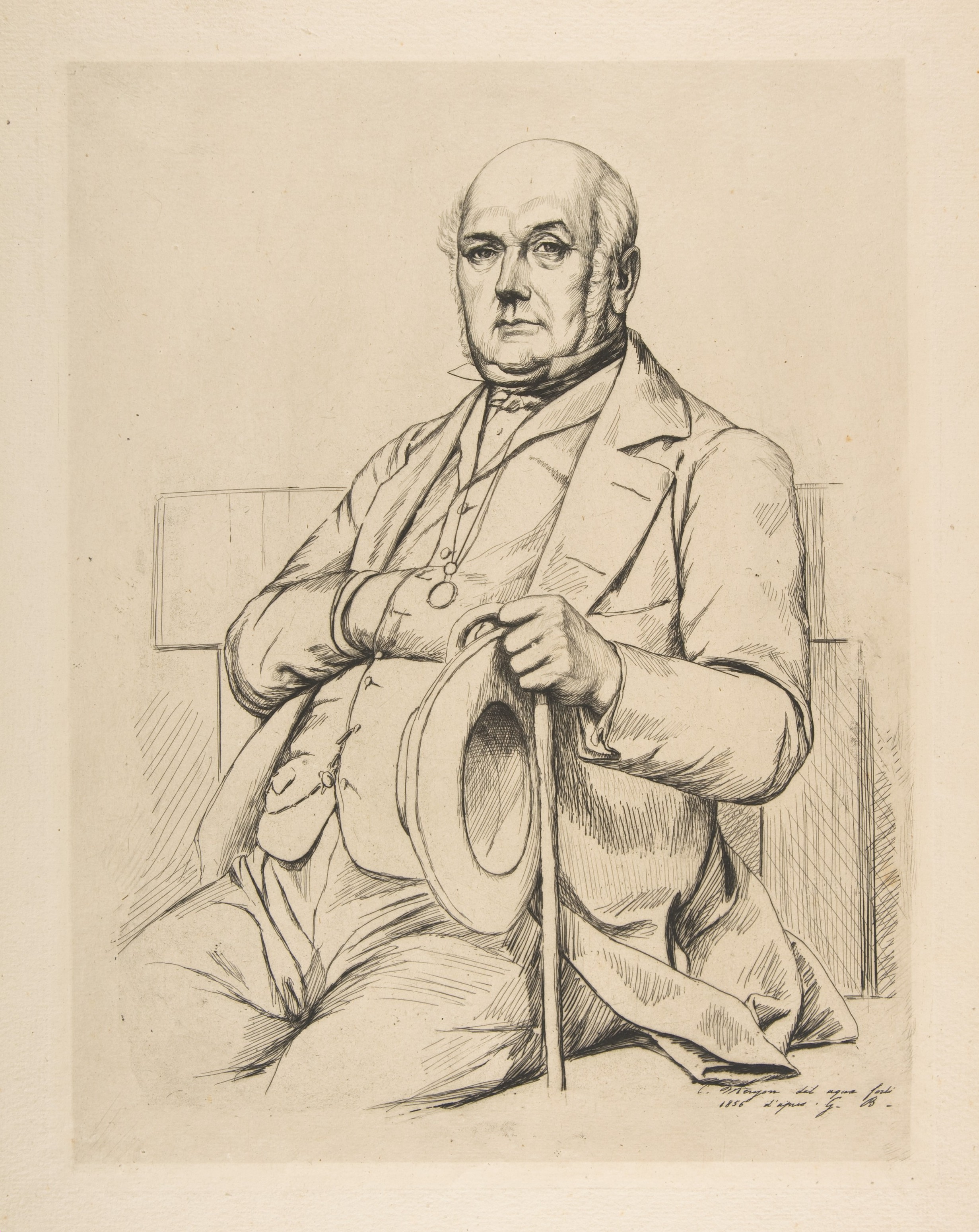
Casimir Leconte, 1856, etching, Metropolitan Museum

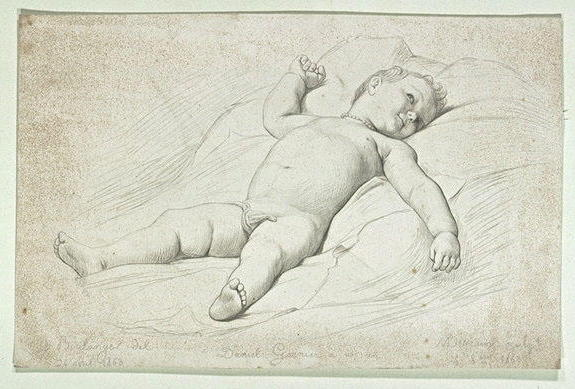
Daniel Garnier sleeping, c. 1862, Musée du Louvre

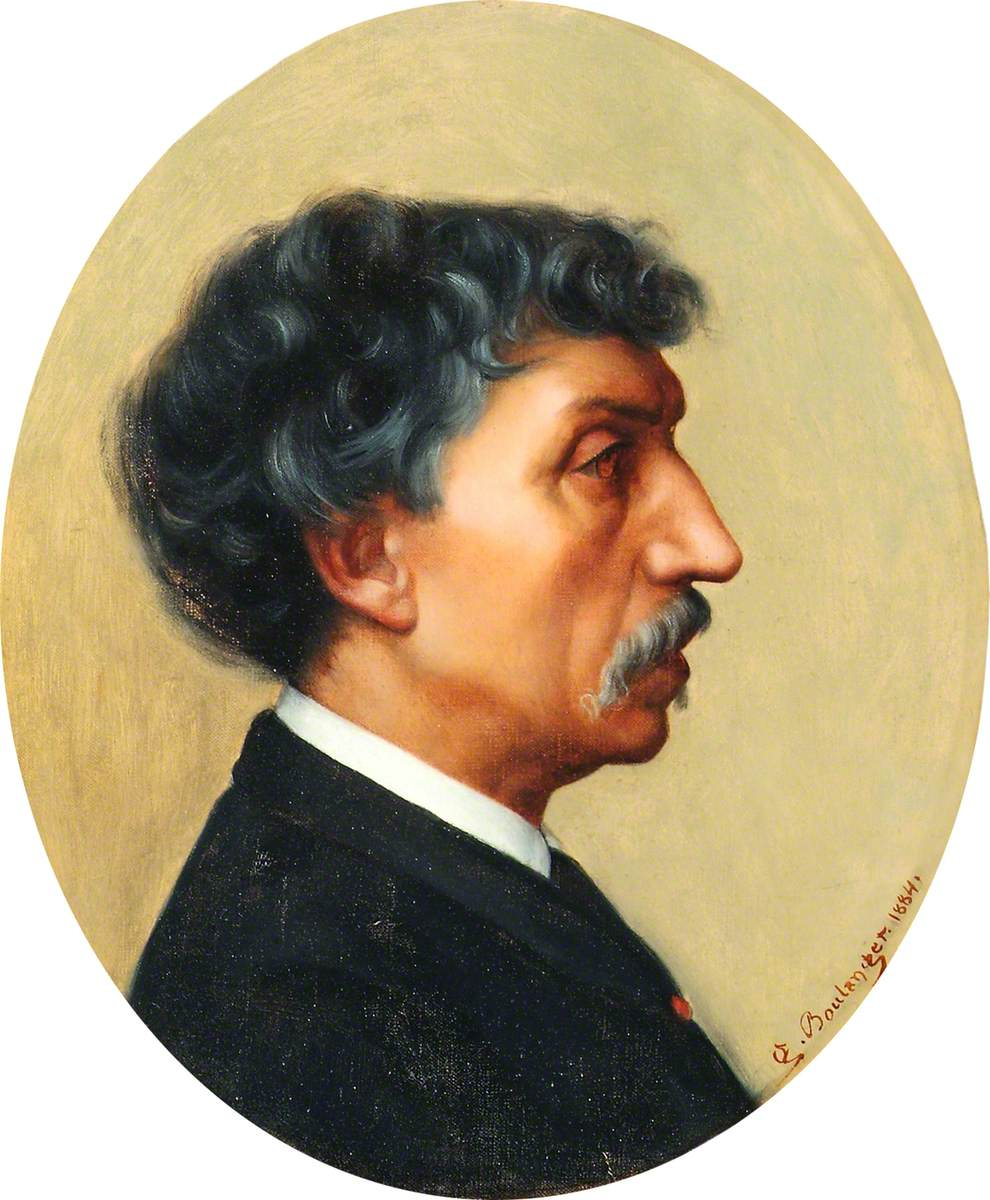
Charles Garnier, 1884, Aberdeen Art Gallery

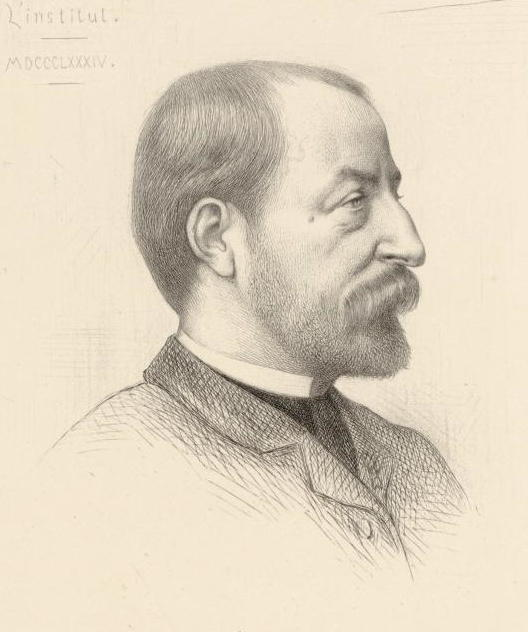
Camille Saint-Saëns, 1884, Bibliothèque nationale de France

=== The Slave Market ===
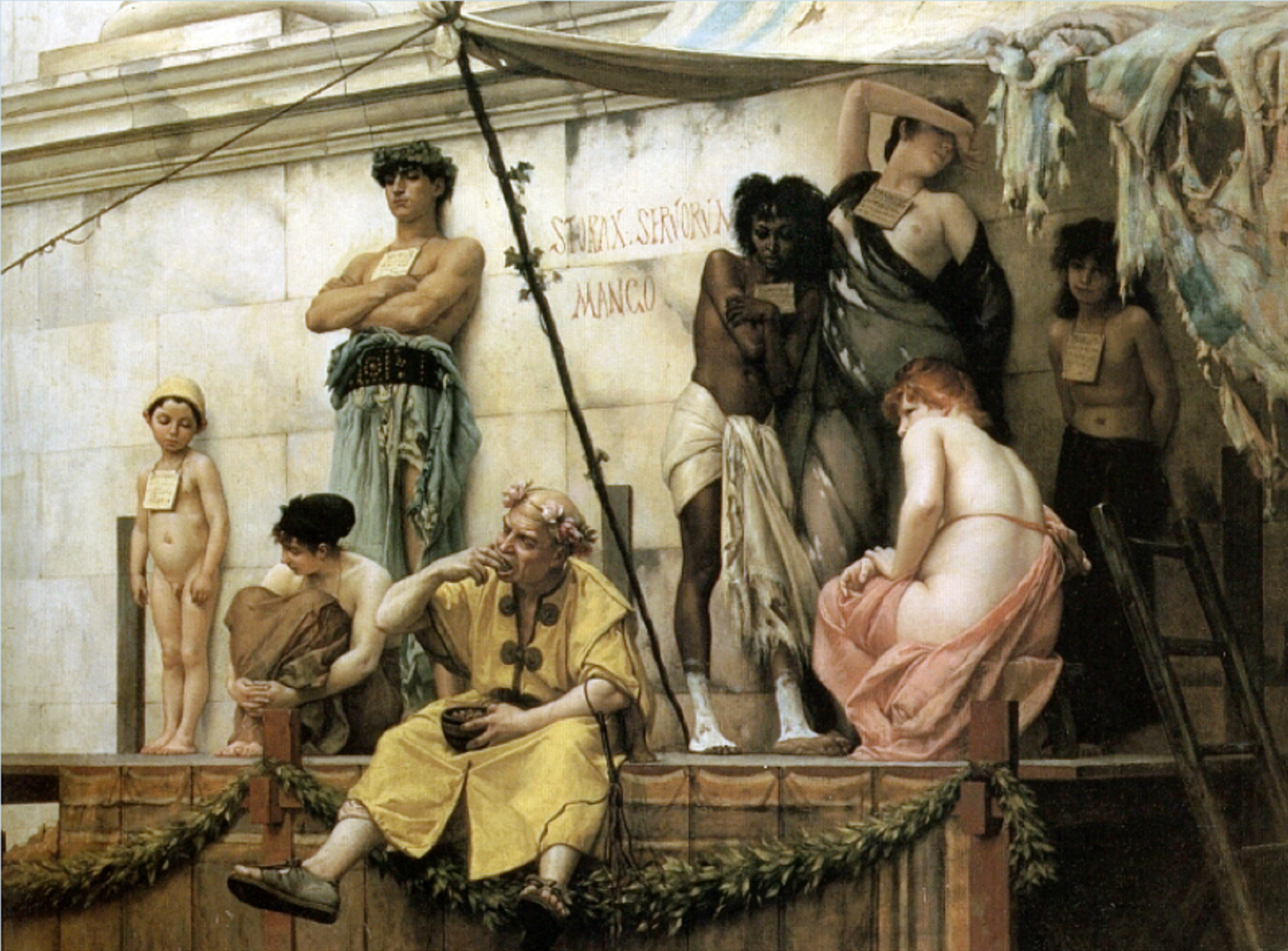
The Slave Market, 1886

Boulanger produced one of his most famous paintings near the end of his life, shown at the Paris Salon of 1886: Un Maquignon d’esclaves à Rome (A Slave Dealer in Rome), which has become better known as The Slave Market. A "pendant" painting, Esclaves à vendre (Slaves for Sale), followed in 1888 and was to be Boulanger's last exhibited painting. Though set in the ancient Roman world, these paintings are stylistically closer to Boulanger's Orientalist works. The realism is stark, with none of the playfulness and luxurious fantasy of his previous Classical paintings; The Slave Market seems a world away from Répétition du "Joueur de flûte".

The Slave Market is thought to be in a private collection. The status and location of Esclaves à vendre (known only from a black and white reproduction) is unknown.

== Teacher and advocate of Academic art ==
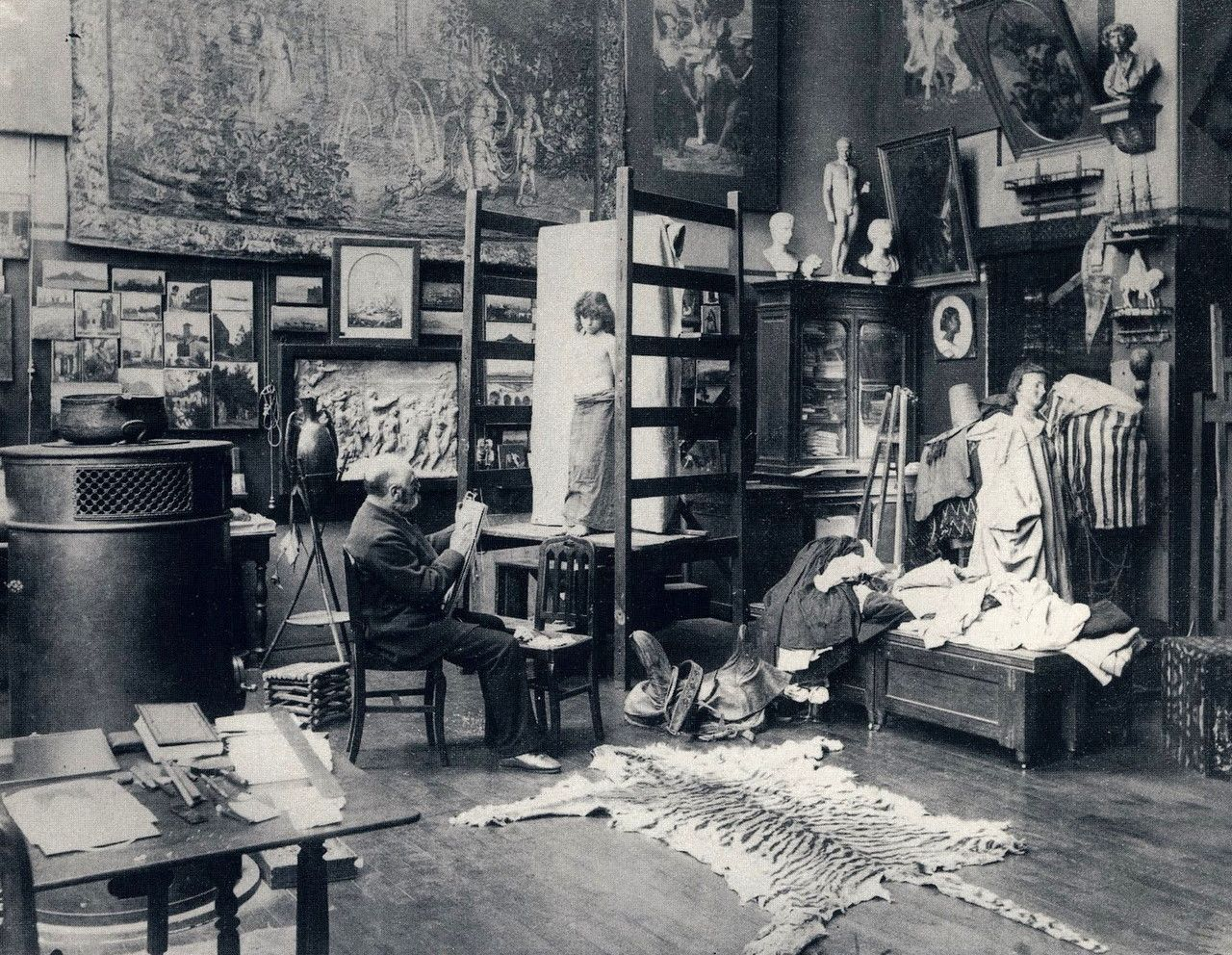
Boulanger in his Paris atelier, c. 1888; photo attributed to Auguste Giraudon

Boulanger was an influential teacher with a long list of students.

At the prestigious Académie Julian, Boulanger, unlike many instructors, accepted both male and female students. Alice De Wolf Kellogg remembered Boulanger as her favorite teacher, writing, "His instruction was the simplest—most broad—most rousing…that I ever received."

When Boulanger was inducted as a member of the Institut de France in 1882, he joined the faculty of the Beaux-Arts de Paris (more formally known as the École nationale supérieure des beaux-arts). In his final years he was a teacher and a champion of Academic art and its traditions and methods. After joining the faculty he delivered and published two speeches. The first was Notice sur M. Lehmann in 1883, an encomium to the recently deceased Henri Lehmann, whom Boulanger saw as an exemplar of artistic virtues.

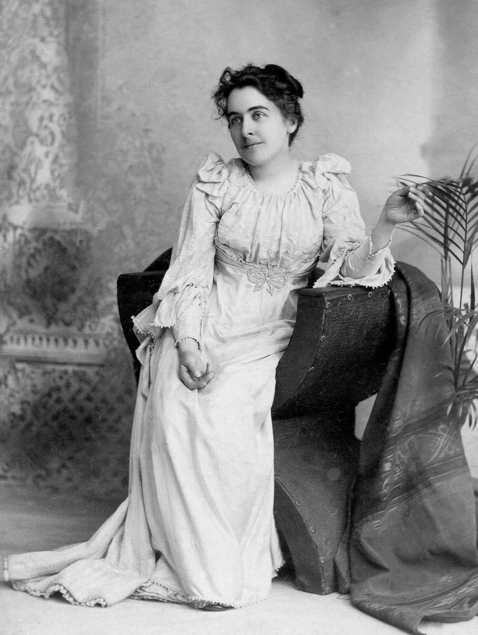
Alice De Wolf Kellogg

The second speech was À nos élèves (To Our Students) delivered in 1885, in which Boulanger attacked what he saw as a decadent, vain striving for novelty in the arts. "We see this so-called novelty appear from year to year under pretentious and ill-justified names such as naturalism, impressionism, luminism, intentionism, tachisme—to use the slang with which they claim to glorify impotence and laziness." He went on to deliver a paean to the accomplishments of French art, praising the rigorous standards passed from masters to students that had made Paris the art capital of the world. He quoted Claudius Popelin: "Art must be a chain; it is when it breaks that there is decadence."

In response to this speech, Octave Mirbeau wrote a mocking rebuttal, "La Tristesse de M. Boulanger", which asserted that "the doctrines of M. Boulanger have no effect, no influence, good or bad, on men...He can write letters, heap volume upon volume, and deliver all the speeches he likes...He cannot make these ideas give talent to those who lack it, or take genius away from those who have it!"

In a letter to Eugéne Montrosier dated 17 July 1888, Boulanger wrote: "I fight Modernity to the utmost when it manifests itself in the clownish pranksters who have elevated all their impotence and all their laziness to the state of principles. But, these people are still very few in number…There are, beside them, a lot of young men who have talent that I really appreciate. Now, the rowdy Modernity of which you speak, believe me, has no future; it will pass as I have seen so many others pass, of which nothing remains after a few years."

Montrosier in an obituary wrote: "Gustave Boulanger, beneath his peaceful exterior, hid an iron will and a wrestler's temperament. He was sometimes wrong; he did not want to go with his century and lend himself to the changes that French art had to undergo, but he resisted in good faith and fought with conviction."

== Personal life ==
=== Friendship with Charles Garnier ===
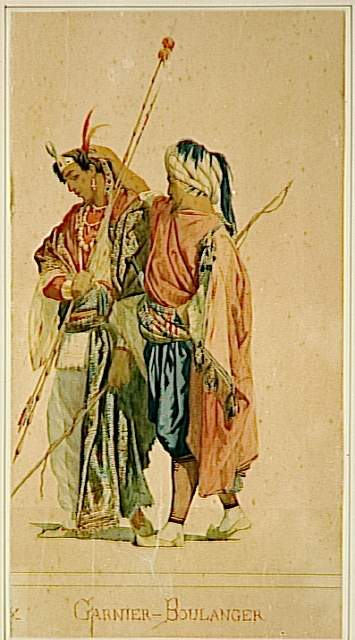
Anonymous watercolor, Garnier and Boulanger at a masked ball, Villa Medici, 1851

Boulanger shared a long and fruitful relationship, both personal and professional, with the architect Charles Garnier. Garnier obtained the Grand Prix de Rome in 1848 at age twenty-three, for architecture. Boulanger obtained his Grand Prix de Rome for art the next year at age twenty-five, and the two met as students enjoying their subsequent scholarships at the French Academy at Rome. A portrait of Garnier by Boulanger dated 1854 is in the collection of the Academy at the Villa Medici. Boulanger would execute several more portraits of Garnier over the decades.

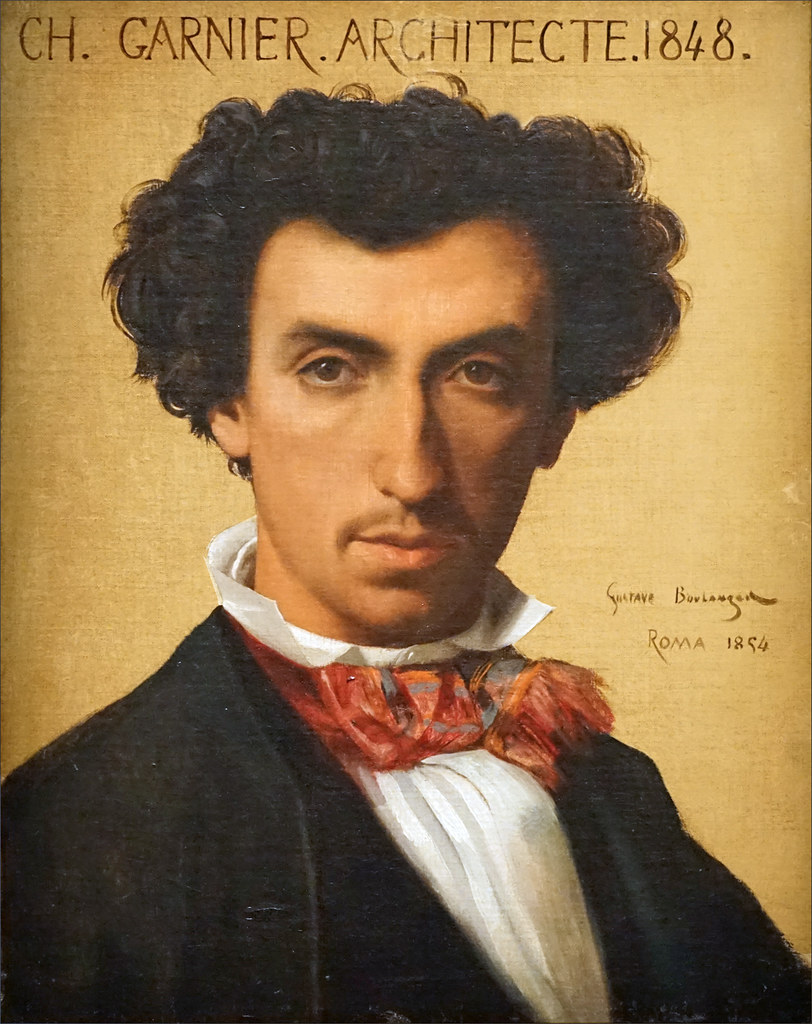
Portrait de Garnier, 1854

In 1868, Boulanger spent the month of May traveling in Spain with Garnier and his wife, Louise Bary Garnier. Garnier's travel journal, filled with architectural sketches and character studies, includes a few drawings by Boulanger, and several sketches of Boulanger by Garnier, including one of "pauvre Boulanger" with a scarf binding his jaw with the knot tied atop his head, suffering a toothache. The Bibliothèque nationale de France has made the original manuscript of Garnier's Voyage en Espagne freely available online, and an English translation with facsimile of the original was published in 2012.

The two friends found the opportunity to collaborate when Garnier designed two opulent opera houses and commissioned Boulanger to execute large and elaborate paintings to decorate walls and ceilings. Boulanger's paintings for the Foyer de la Danse in the Opéra Garnier in Paris (1875) and his massive ceiling painting Allegory of Music high above the stage of the Opéra de Monte-Carlo (1879) were judged by some critics to be his most successful work.

The two men came to share a familial intimacy and were in almost daily contact. Boulanger's closeness to the Garniers can be seen in his drawing of their infant son Daniel sleeping, made around 1862; the child died at age two. The poignant memento eventually passed from the Garnier family to the Louvre.

In a letter to Garnier, Boulanger inquired: "How is the earthly envelope of that beautiful soul that is so dear to me? Do you know you are the second person in my life in whom have I found an imagination and a heart after my own fashion?" (Boulanger does not name the first person.)

Born a year and a half apart, Boulanger and Garnier died within a year of each other.

=== Friendship with Mademoiselle Nathalie ===
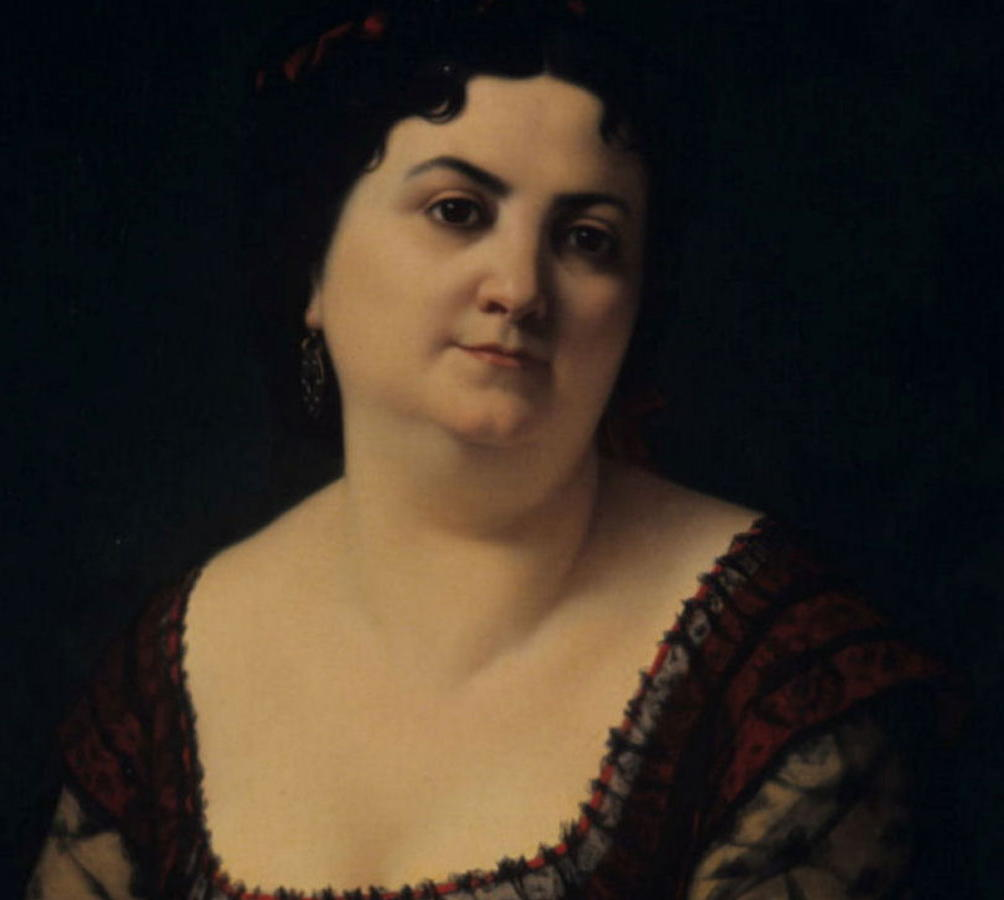
Mlle. Nathalie, 1867

Boulanger was the close friend of one of the most famous actresses in France, Zaïre-Nathalie Martel, known to one and all as Mademoiselle Nathalie. She remains a legend in the annals of the Comedie-Française, not least for her quarrel with the much younger Sarah Bernhardt. At a ceremony honoring the birthday of Molière on 15 January 1863, Bernhardt's younger sister, Regina, stepped on the train of Mademoiselle Nathalie's gown. Mademoiselle Nathalie shoved Regina off the gown, causing the girl to strike a stone column and gash her forehead. Bernhardt stepped forward and slapped Mademoiselle Nathalie so hard that the older actress fell onto another actor. When Bernhardt refused to apologize, she was forced to leave the Comedie-Française.

While some contemporary writers said that Boulanger and Nathalie were married, the foremost Boulanger scholar of the 20th century, Marie-Madeleine Aubrun, refuted this: "Although here and there the idea of marriage has been insinuated, we have found no written trace of it. Furthermore, the actress's death announcement in 1885 does not mention the name of Gustave Boulanger, which seems surprising. And above all, the death certificate specifies célibataire [single]."

Mademoiselle Nathalie died three years before Boulanger, in 1885. He donated his portrait of her, painted in 1867, to the Comedie-Française.

=== Personal appearance ===
Boulanger's self-portrait at age 30 or 31, executed while he was in Rome, depicts an artist with a penetrating gaze and an elegantly waxed mustache. But a later art historian was struck by the contrast between the older Boulanger's personal appearance and the polished perfection of his art. "As for G. Boulanger, his works, all of grace, elegance and charm, do not correspond at all to our picture of him. A round face with a flattened, bald head, a squat nose, a small mouth, half-closed eyes, a shaggy beard—these are the traits of a magician of color and form, the creator of so many exquisite works!...And yet, as with Verlaine, of whom the image of Boulanger makes one think, what delicacy lies beneath this rough bark!"

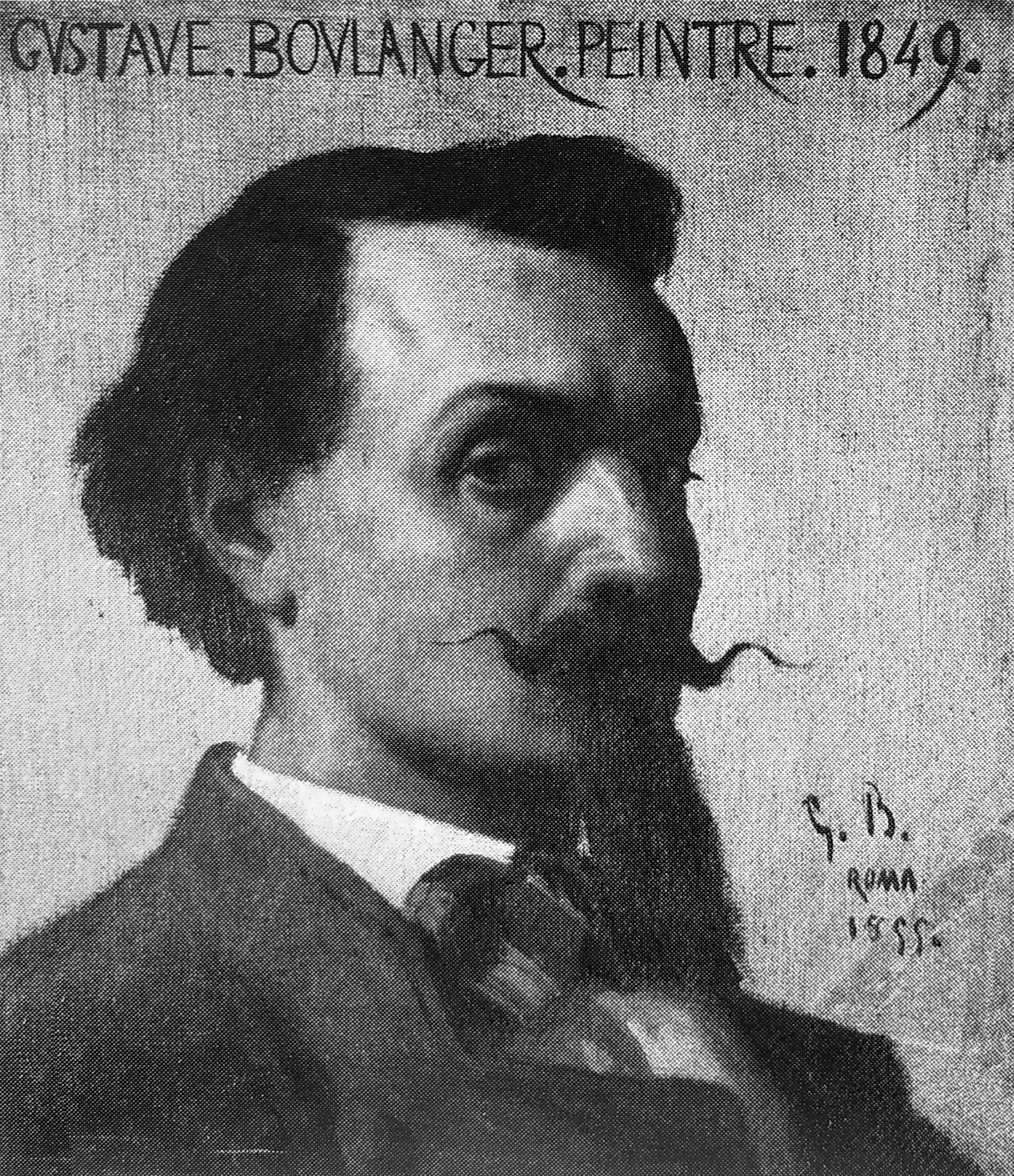
Self-portrait, 1855

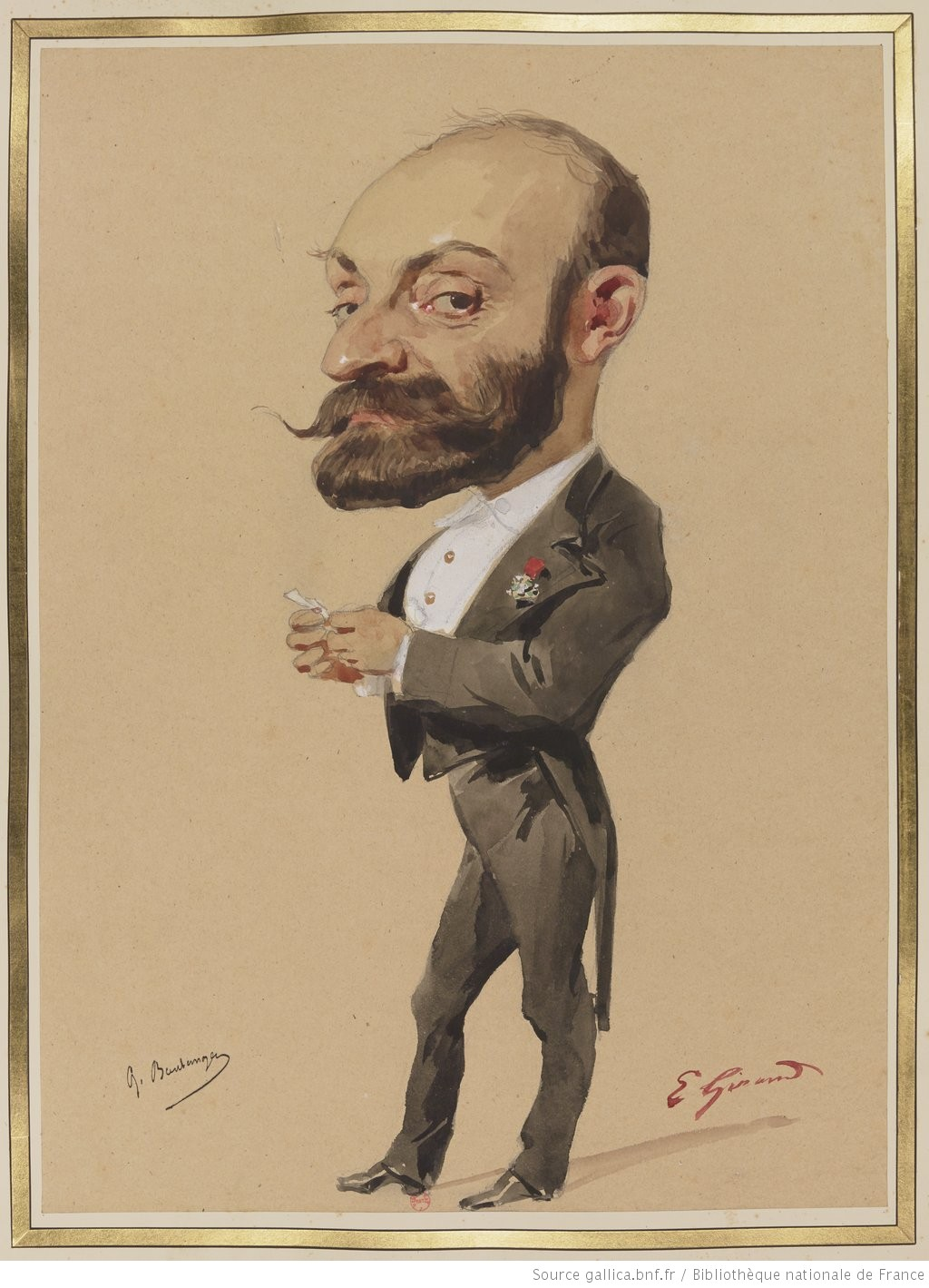
Caricature by Eugène Giraud, 1867

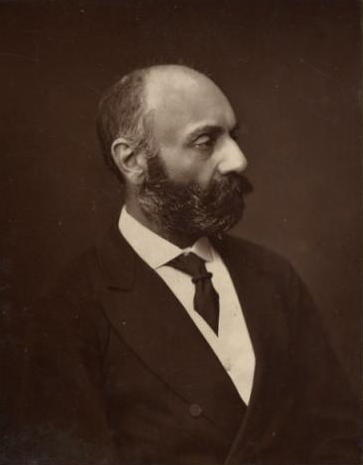
Photo by Ferdinand Mulnier, 1880

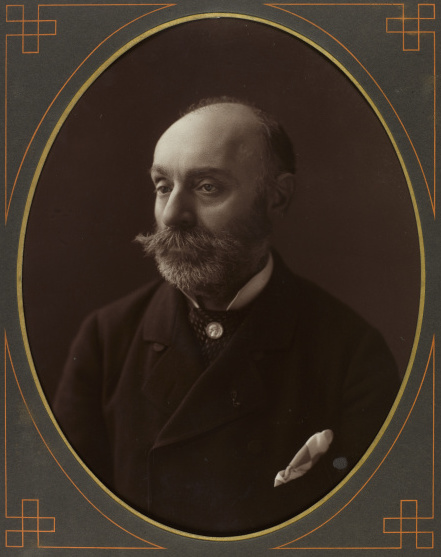
Photo by Eugène Pirou

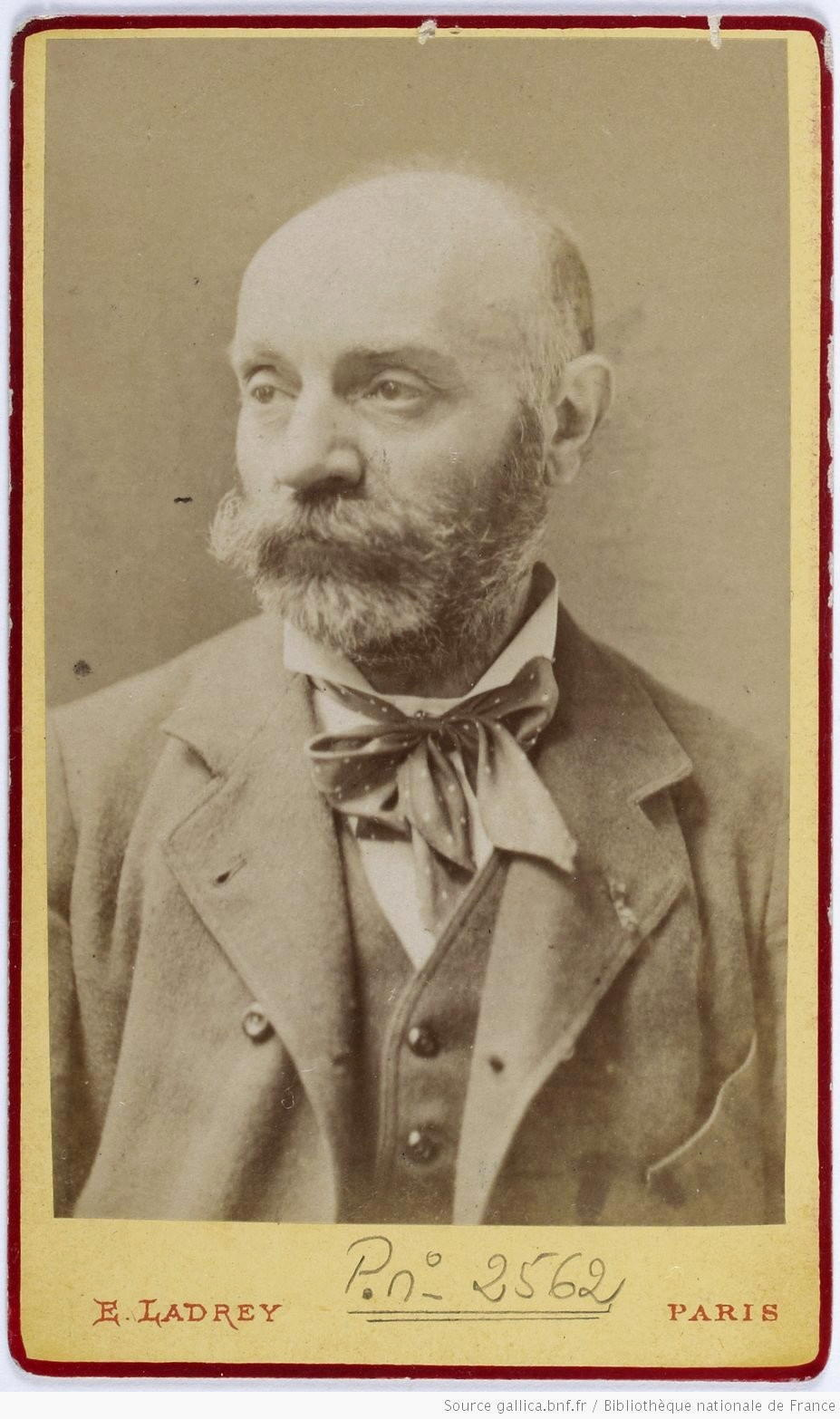
Photo by Ernest Ladrey, published 1888

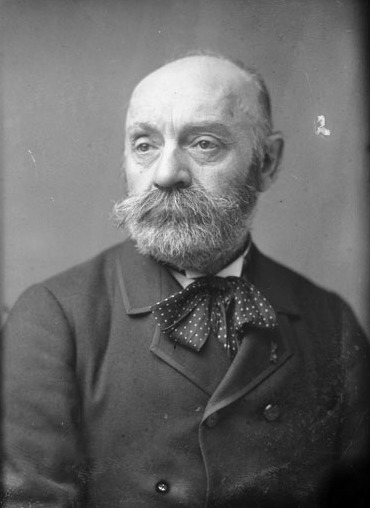
Photo by Atelier Pierre Petit et fils, c. 1888

== Death ==
On the evening of Friday, 21 September 1888, Boulanger suffered a pulmonary congestion, took to bed, and died the next day.

Eugène Montrosier, who saw him on his deathbed, wrote that

Gustave Boulanger must have had a presentiment of his death, because, on the very day he was to fall ill, he insisted on reproducing, in a vehement study, the portrait of a three-year-old child whose photograph had been before him for several months, a project he had been setting aside. Yes, his last painting was done with the feverish haste of those who fear they will not be able to finish the work they have begun in time. Added Charles Narrey: "Gustave Boulanger sang while painting. I had never seen him in such good spirits, nor so full of confidence. Showing me this portrait, he said: 'I passed for a good draftsman, but only now I feel that I am on the way to becoming a good painter.'"

Without family, at his home at rue Ballu, 6, Boulanger died attended by his concierge and two praying nuns. He was given "a beautiful funeral" attended by "le tout Paris artistique et littéraire," with speeches by his friends Henri Chapu, Tony Robert-Fleury, and Charles Garnier. By his will his estate was split between his cousin Paulemma Hennequin, his goddaughter Nathalia Desbrosses, and Mademoiselle Nathalie; having pre-deceased him, her share was claimed by the State.

== Legacy ==
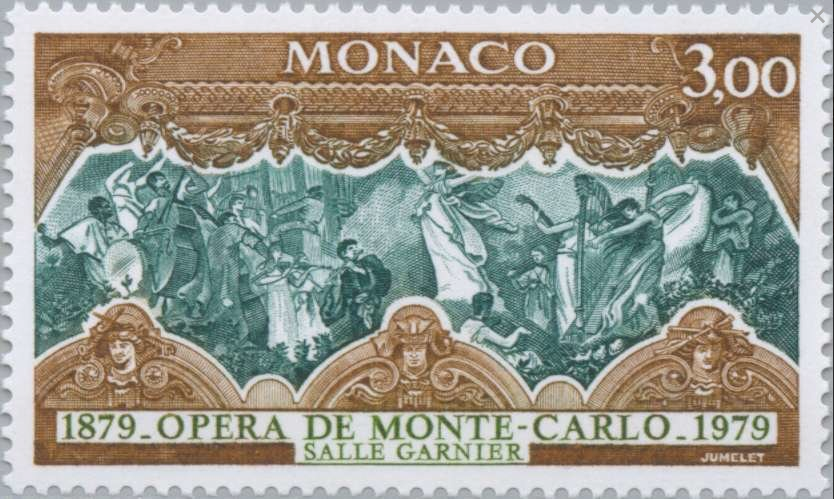
Postage stamp issued in 1979 by Monaco commemorating the 100th anniversary of the Opéra de Monte-Carlo, picturing the "Allegory of Music" ceiling painting by Boulanger above the stage

Boulanger's long and influential teaching career carried forward his principles of art well into the next century, even as the countervailing influence of Impressionism and other movements ultimately prevailed. Unlike Gérôme (who died in 1904), he did not live long enough to see the tide turn decisively against him, but the tide was turning nonetheless. An unsigned obituary in the Courrier de l'Art was scathing, saying that Boulanger was "a perfectly gallant man, a very mediocre painter, and in no way an artist," who "taught better than he painted. The man is deeply and very legitimately missed; the painter will not be, not because M. Boulanger painted mainly Greek or Roman subjects, but because he massacred them constantly by painting them without any trace of originality, without the slightest style, with the most despairing vulgarity, a ruthlessly convinced harshness and the most routine monotony."

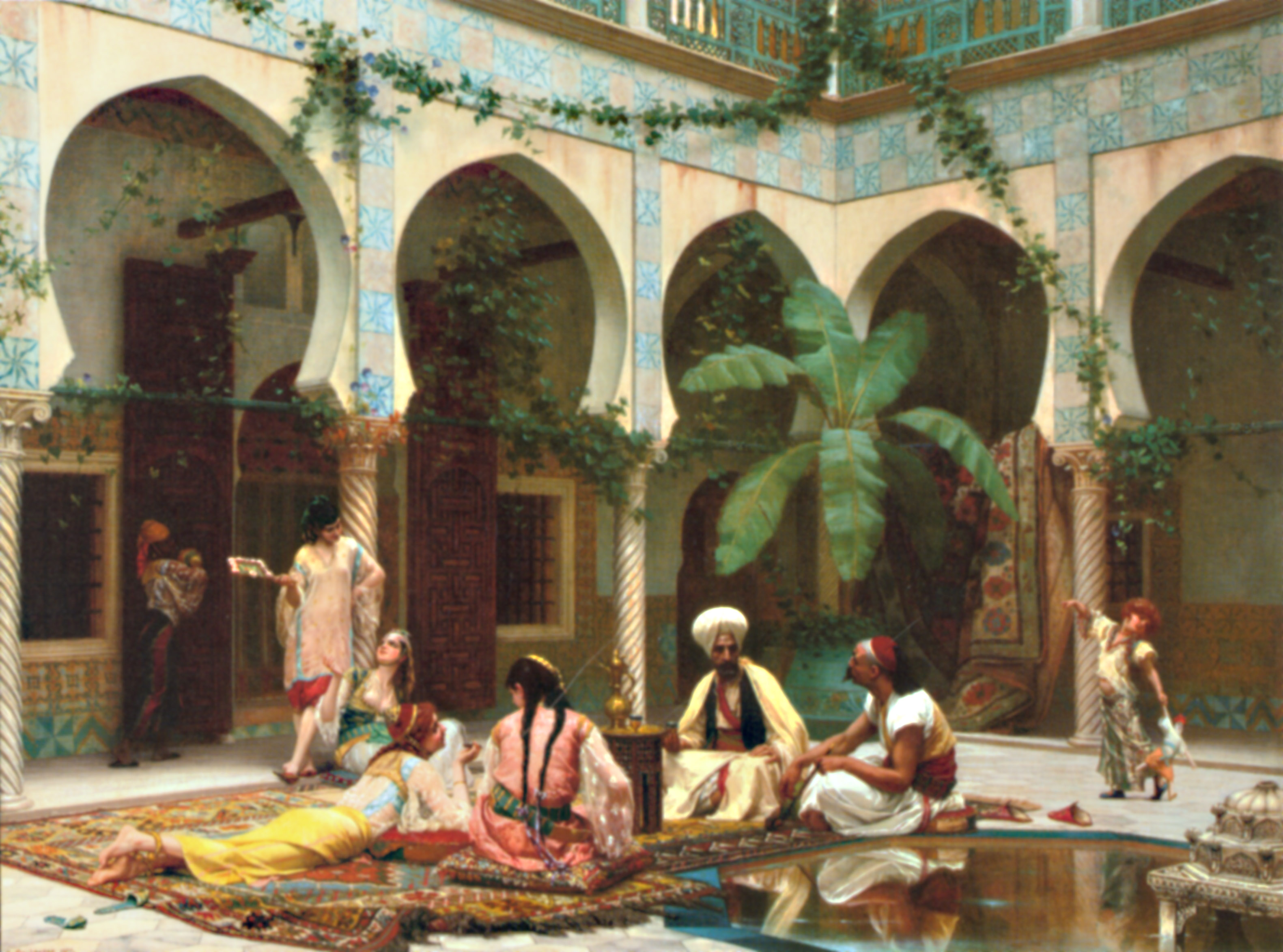
La Cour du Palais de Dar Khdaouedj El Amia, Alger (1877), auctioned for $576,000 at Christie's in 2005, a record for a Boulanger.

The British critic Marion Spielmann wrote a less hostile but still ambivalent assessment: "France has lost one of her most popular painters. I say 'popular' advisedly, for although he was a painter who always reached a high level of excellence...he never rose to be a really great artist," and his talent, though "of a very high order…never once reached the borderland of absolute genius." Spielmann noted that Boulanger was most often compared to Gérôme and Alma-Tadema, but in such comparisons "the times were few indeed when Boulanger...came out the victor." Spielmann suggested that it was for his decorations, such as his paintings at the Opéra Garnier, that Boulanger would "retain his reputation."

The enormous fame and prestige of Gérôme and Alma-Tadema precipitously declined and virtually collapsed in the next century—Gérôme's painting The Snake Charmer, which sold for $19,500 in 1888, sold for just $500 in 1942. But while the works of those two artists are once again attracting the interest of collectors, scholars, and the general public, Boulanger remains obscure. No large-scale reassessment, such at that accorded Gérôme with the 2010 exhibitions at the Getty Museum and the Musée d'Orsay, has been granted to Boulanger.

Boulanger's Orientalist works, like those of other painters in the genre, have risen sharply in value in the 21st century (thanks largely to a generation of immensely wealthy Arab collectors who "want to take it back and have it for themselves"), but in this field his auction records are a fraction of those of Gérôme.

Boulanger and Gérôme were linked from the very beginning of their careers. Edmond About wrote in 1867:

Boulanger hatched from the same atelier as Gérôme. He has not always followed the same route; his very independent originality led him sometimes to right, sometimes to left; influences from Rome and the Academic milieu effected deviations here and there; but there is always a visible kinship between those two talents. Curiosity, research, finesse and a grain of preciousness, love of the new, passion for the finished, need for exact detail: these are the common features that unite these two artists and maintain their family resemblance.

The American art critic Earl Shinn went so far as to call Boulanger "a sort of alter ego of Gérôme's" who "fits his peculiarities into those of his friend like the lining into the waistcoat," but allowed that "occasionally, as in recent decorations of a Paris mayor's office," Boulanger could strike "a classical vein with more popular grace than Gérôme, though with less originality."

Forever compared to Gérôme (and deemed the lesser artist), Boulanger seems fated to dwell in his shadow. No art historian or curator has undertaken the task of decoupling Boulanger's legacy, so as to allow a full assessment of his work, based solely on its own merits.

== Boulanger in museums ==
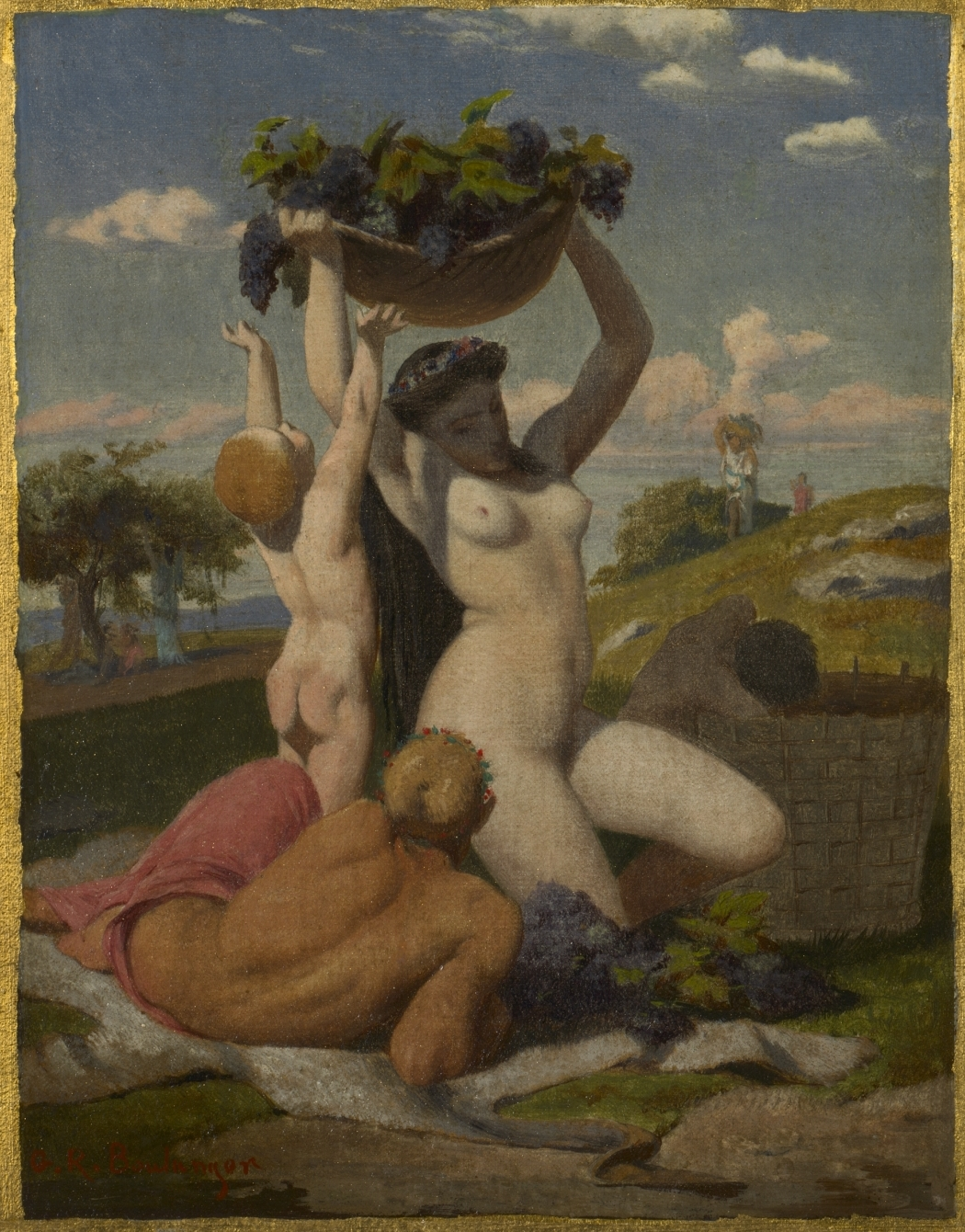
L'Automne, detail from Four Seasons, 1850, Cleveland Museum of Art

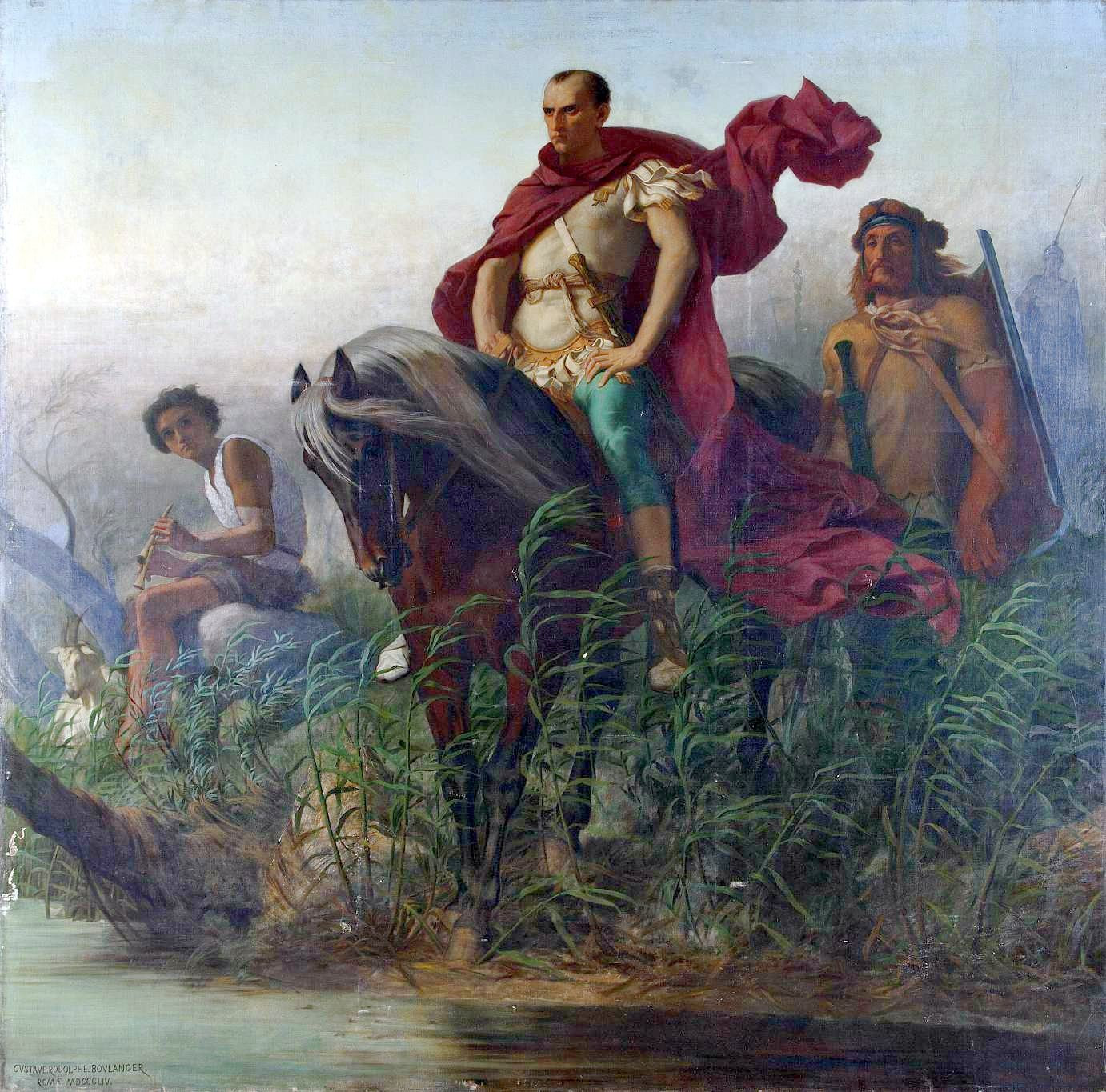
Jules-César arrivé au Rubicon, 1854, Musée de Picardie, Amiens

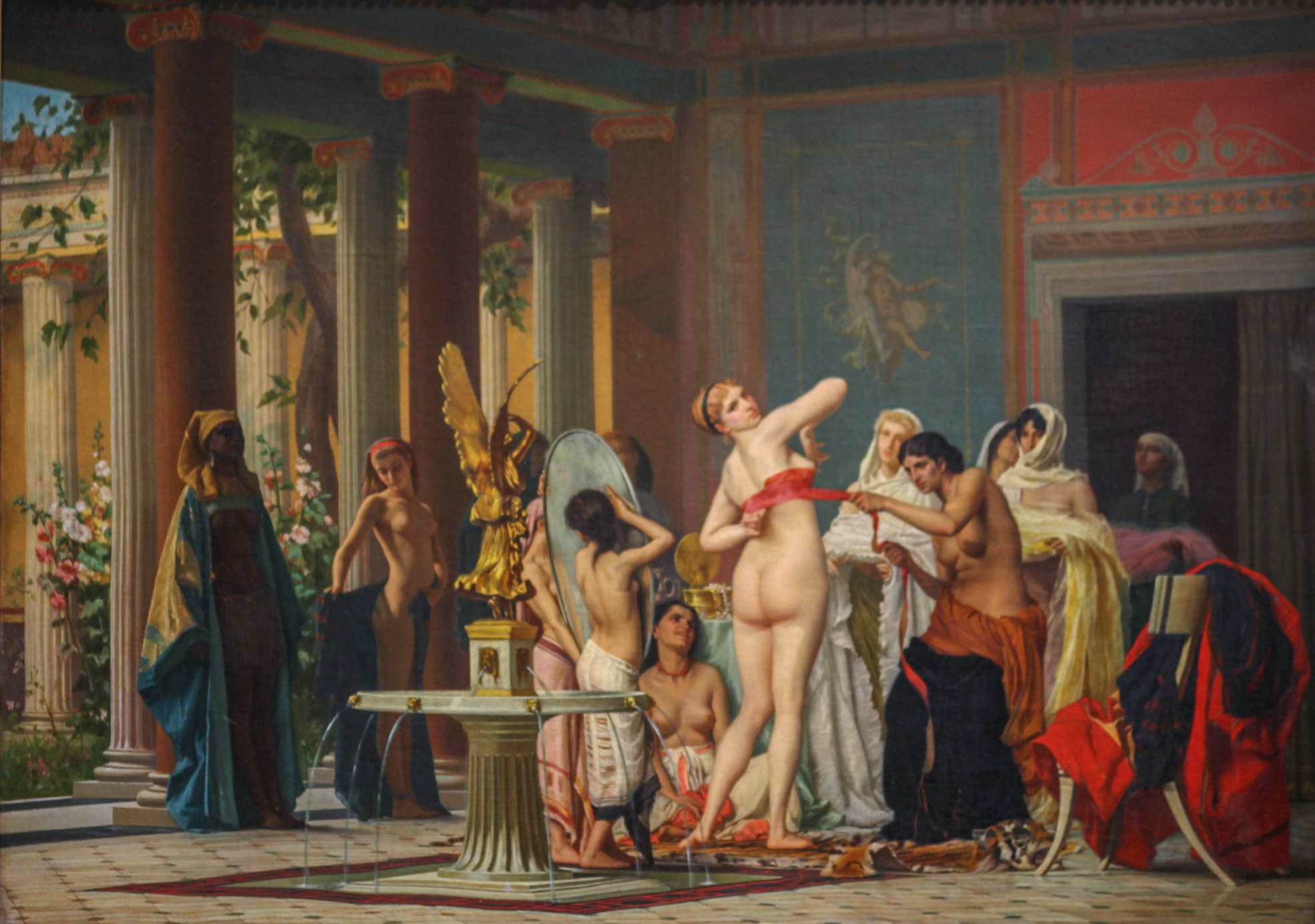
Le Mamillare 1867, Musée des Beaux-Arts d'Angers

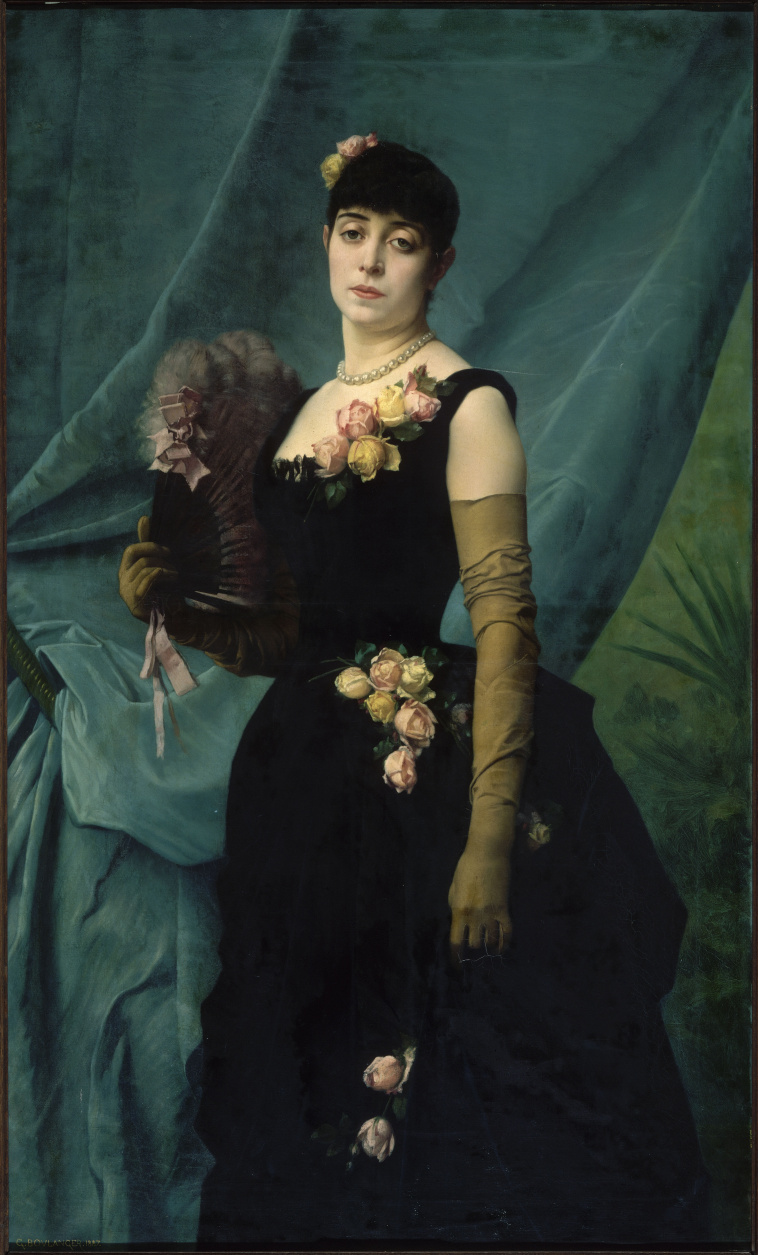
Portrait de Madame Lambinet, 1887, Musée Lambinet, Versailles

=== Paris ===
- La Mort de Cyrus (study), 1844, École nationale supérieure des beaux-arts.
- Ulysse reconnu par Euryclée, 1849, École nationale supérieure des beaux-arts.
- Portrait du poète et librettiste Camille du Commun du Locle, 1854, gouache, watercolor and pencil, Musée du Louvre département des Arts graphiques.
- Répétition du “Joueur de flûte” et de “La femme de Diomède” chez le prince Napoléon (study), 1860, Comédie-Française.
- Répétition du “Joueur de flûte” et de “La femme de Diomède” chez le prince Napoléon, 1861, Musée d’Orsay.
- Daniel Garnier endormi (drawing of Charles Garnier's infant son, who lived 1862–1864), c. 1862, Musée du Louvre département des Arts graphiques.
- Portrait de Zaïre-Nathalie Martel, dite Mademoiselle Nathalie, 1867, Comédie-Française.
- Sarrebruck après la bataille, c. 1870, Musée Carnavalet.
- L’Assaut du cimetière par les troupes régulières, 1871, Musée Carnavalet.
- Épisode de la Commune, place de la Concorde, 1871, Musée Carnavalet.
- L’Hôtel de Ville incendié, assailli par les troupes de Versailles, 1871, Musée Carnavalet.
- La Rotonde de la Villette cernée par les troupes Versaillaises, 1871, Musée Carnavalet.
- La tour Saint-Jacques reprise par les troupes Versaillaises, 1871, Musée Carnavalet.
- Les Danses champêtre, bacchique, amoureuse et guerrière (studies), before 1875, Bibliothèque nationale de France.
- Vertus civiques: Le Mariage, Le Départ à la guerre, Vie antique, L'Étude, La Famille, Forge, 1878, studies for the Salle des Mariages de la Mairie du 13e arrondissement, Musée des Beaux-Arts de la Ville de Paris, Petit Palais.
- Portrait de Charles Garnier, n.d., Bibliothèque nationale de France.
- Miscellaneous drawings, sketches and studies, Musée du Louvre département des Arts graphiques.

=== Elsewhere in France ===
- Portrait de Monsieur Sinclair-Desbrosses, 1849, Musée Lambinet.
- Parc de la villa Borghèse à Rome, c. 1847, Musée Hébert, La Tronche.
- Ulysse reconnu par Euryclée (study), 1849, Musée Magnin, Dijon.
- Galathée et le berger Acis, 1848, Musée d'Art et d'Histoire de Narbonne.
- Le Repas des Dieux, after Raphael, 1853, Musée des Beaux-Arts de Rennes.
- Tête d’Italienne, 1854, Musée des Beaux-Arts de Valenciennes.
- César arrive au Rubicon (study), 1854, Musée de Picardie, Amiens.
- César arrive au Rubicon, 1854, Musée de Picardie.
- Venus Captive, 1860, Musée des Beaux-Arts de Dunkerque
- Le Mamillare (or Le Bain; Après le bain), 1867, Musée des Beaux-Arts d'Angers.
- Saint Sébastien et l’empereur Maximilien Hercule, 1877, Musée des Beaux-Arts de Marseille.
- Portrait de Madame Lambinet, née Nathalie Sinclair, 1887, Musée Lambinet, Versailles.

=== Rome ===
- Portraits of Boulanger's fellow pensionnaires at the Académie de France à Rome, Villa Medici: Charles Lecointe, 1849; Jules Duprato and Felix Thomas, 1851; Alfred de Curzon, 1852; Charles Garnier and Jean-Baptiste Gibert, 1854; Adolphe Crauk, Denis Lebouteux, and Boulanger's self-portrait, 1855.

=== The Netherlands ===
- Phryné, 1850, Van Gogh Museum, Amsterdam.

=== Russia ===
- Répétition théâtrale dans la maison d’un poète romain, 1855, Hermitage Museum, Saint Petersburg.

=== United Kingdom ===
- Portrait de Charles Garnier, 1884, Aberdeen Art Gallery.
- Study for 'La danse champêtre', ca. 1875, British Museum.

=== United States ===
- Deux Maures, c. 1850, Baltimore Museum of Art.
- Sirène (or Mermaid), n.d., Baltimore Museum of Art.
- L’Automne, 1850, Cleveland Museum of Art.
- Portrait of Woman and Three Children, drawing, 1852, Metropolitan Museum of Art.

== Boulanger in public buildings ==
- Decorative paintings for the Foyer de la Danse, Opéra Garnier, Paris, 1875:
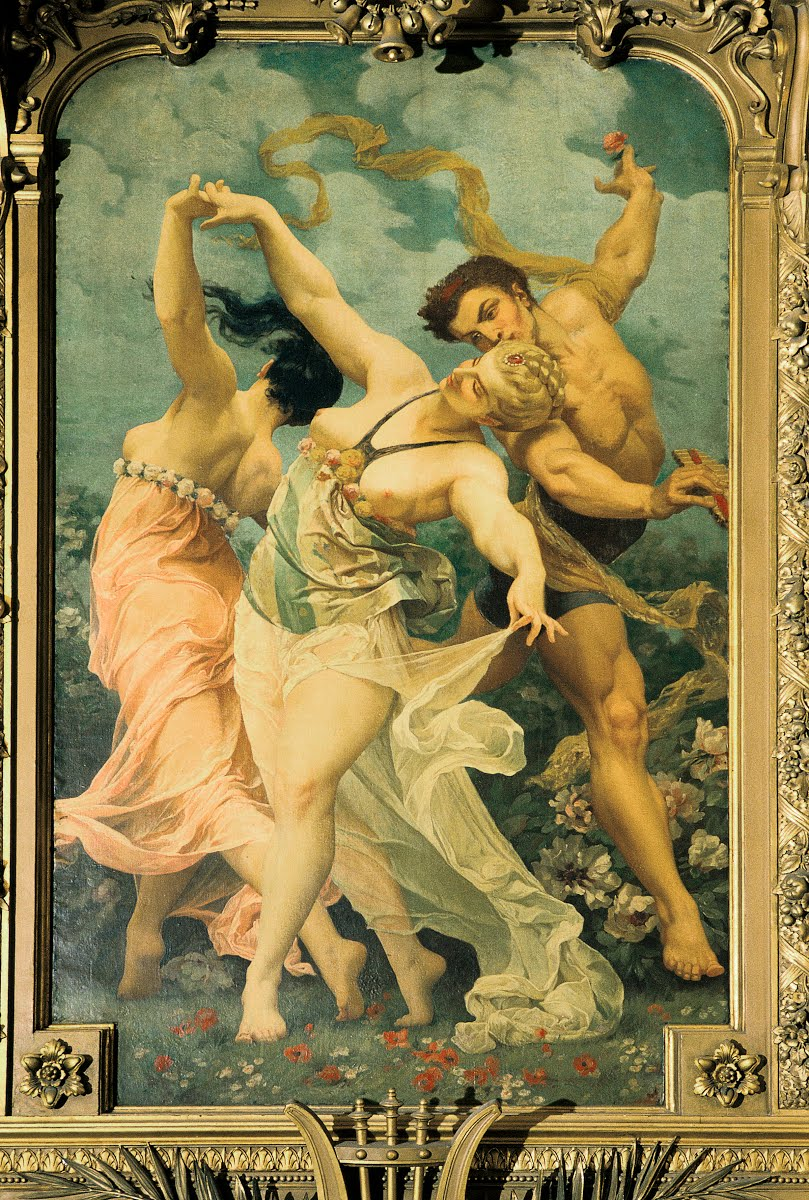
La danse amoureuse

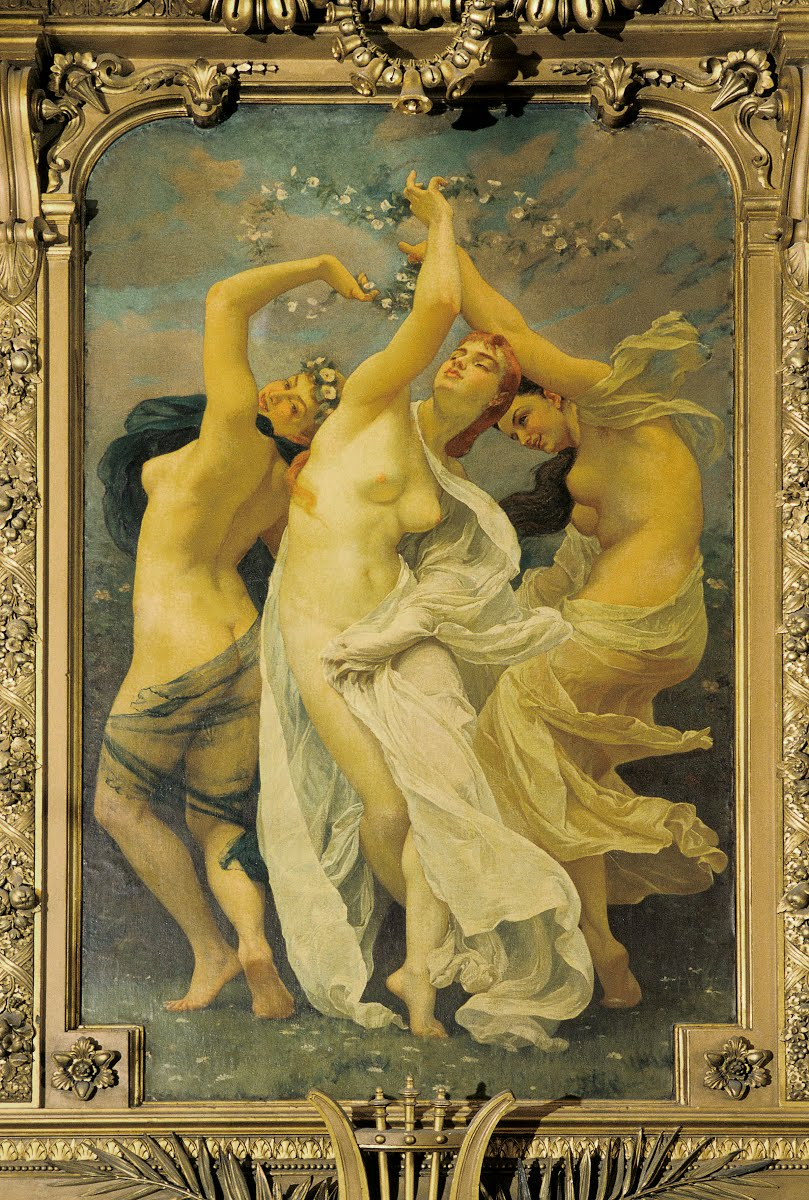
La danse champétre

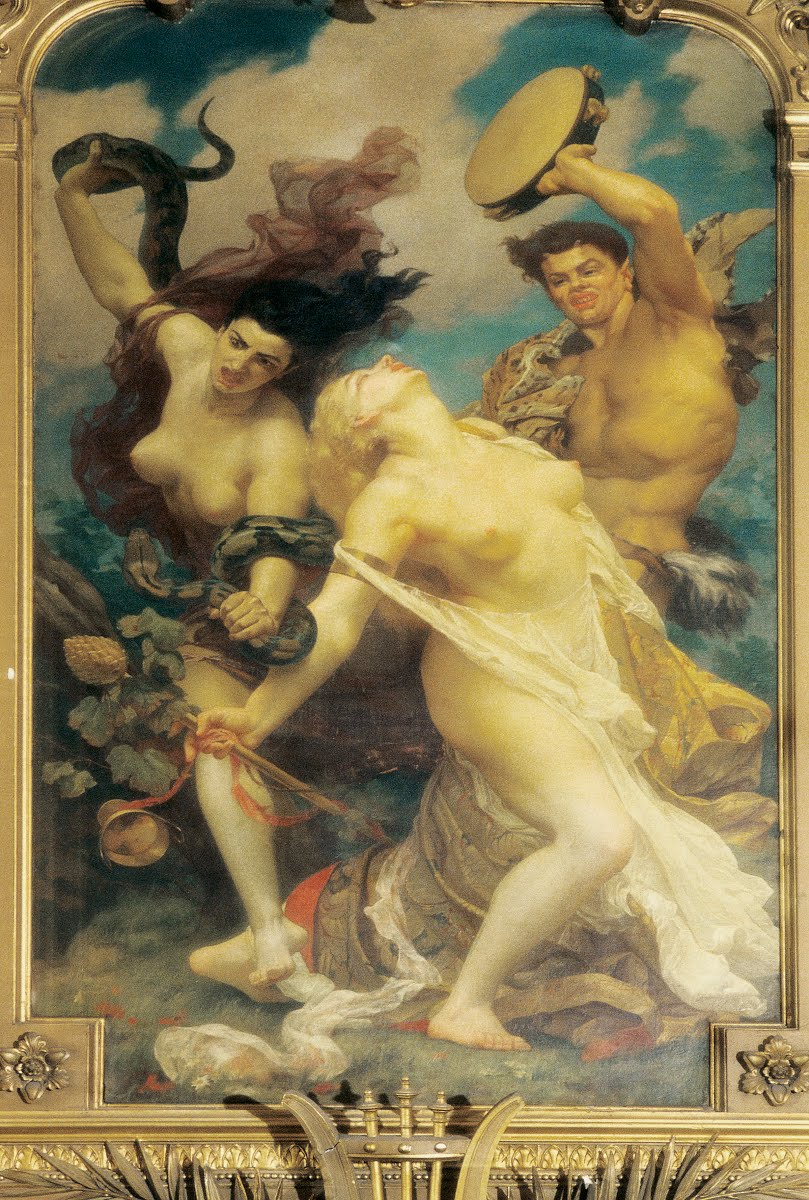
La danse bachique

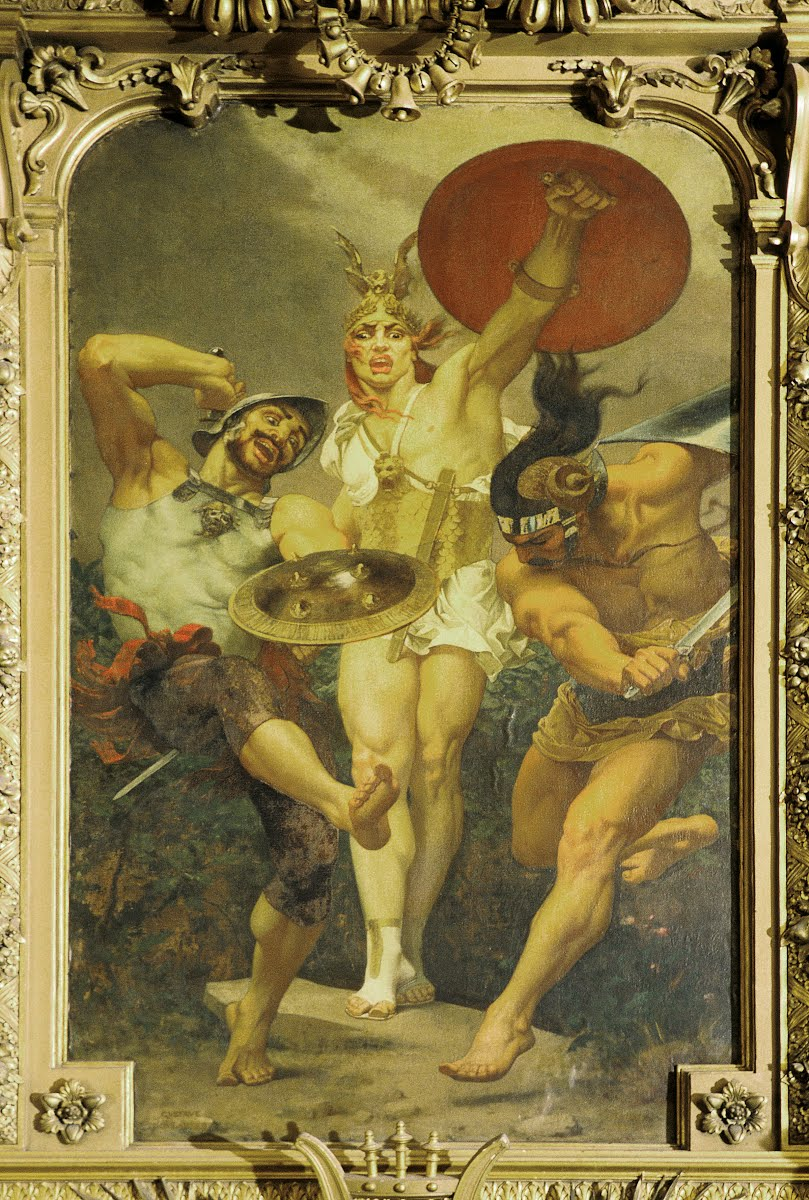
La danse guerrière
- Allegory of Music, ceiling painting above the stage in the Salle Garnier, Opéra de Monte-Carlo, Monaco, 1879.
- Le Mariage; L’Étude; La Patrie; Vir esto; Uxor esto, 1878, Salle des Mariages de la Mairie (city hall) of the 13th arrondissement of Paris. Boulanger combined his expertise at portraiture and at large-scale projects by including images of people close to him when he executed these large murals. Some of these portraits can be identified from preliminary drawings by Boulanger conserved at the Musée Carnavalet. The faces can be clearly seen in an engraving by William Haussoullier after the mural called Le Mariage, or by the longer title Les époux se doivent mutuellement fidélité secours assistance. Boulanger’s close friend Mademoiselle Nathalie is the most prominent of the female figures, dominating the left side. Among the witnesses to the wedding at right can be seen Boulanger’s friends and colleagues Ernest Meissonier, Alexandre Cabanel, Jean-Léon Gérôme, Alexandre Dumas fils, and Boulanger’s closest friend, Charles Garnier. Boulanger also included a self-portrait, the figure at far right. Another study at the Carnavalet depicts the youthful figure leaning against a column and gesturing with his right hand. Earlier studies from the planning stages, conserved at the Petit Palais, show the same figures in a less finished state, without identifiable faces.
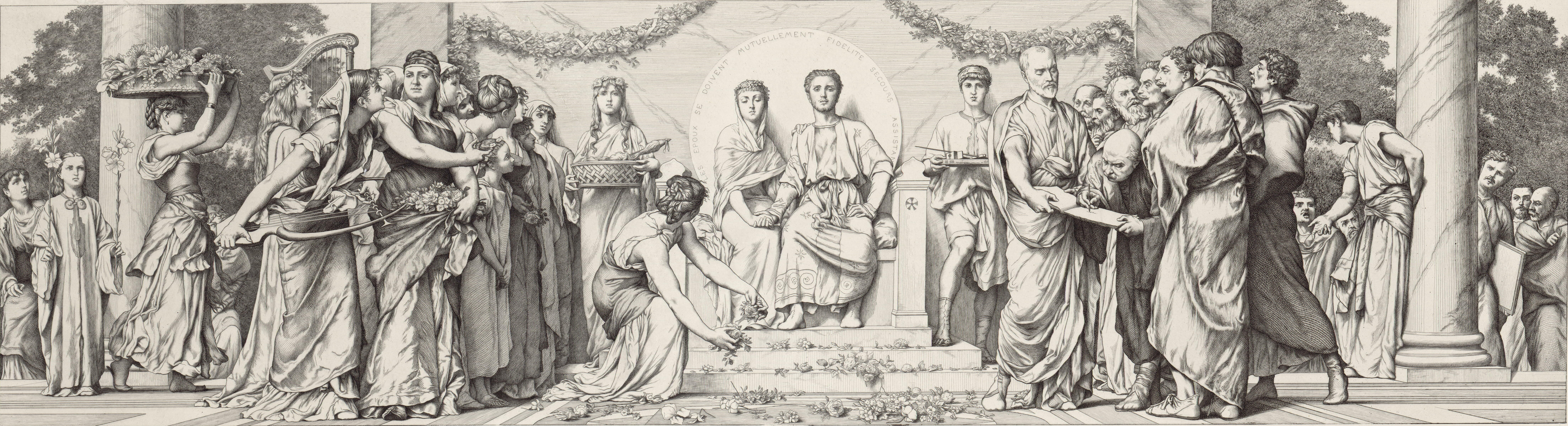
Engraving by Haussoullier after Boulanger's marriage mural; studies and details below.
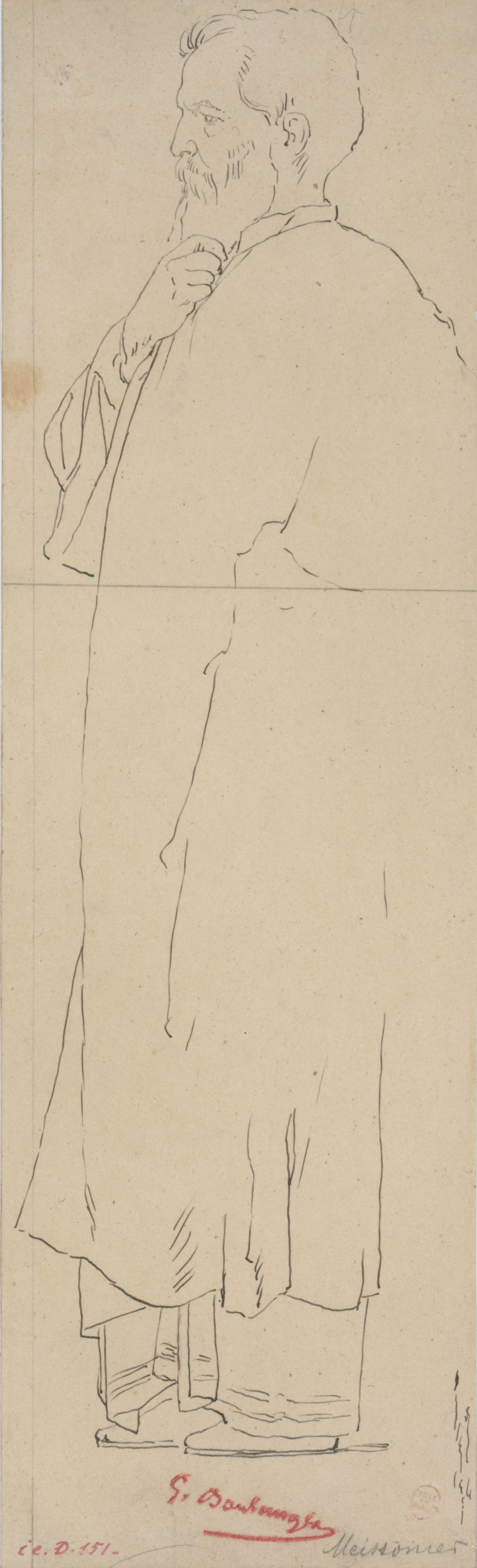
Meisson-
ier

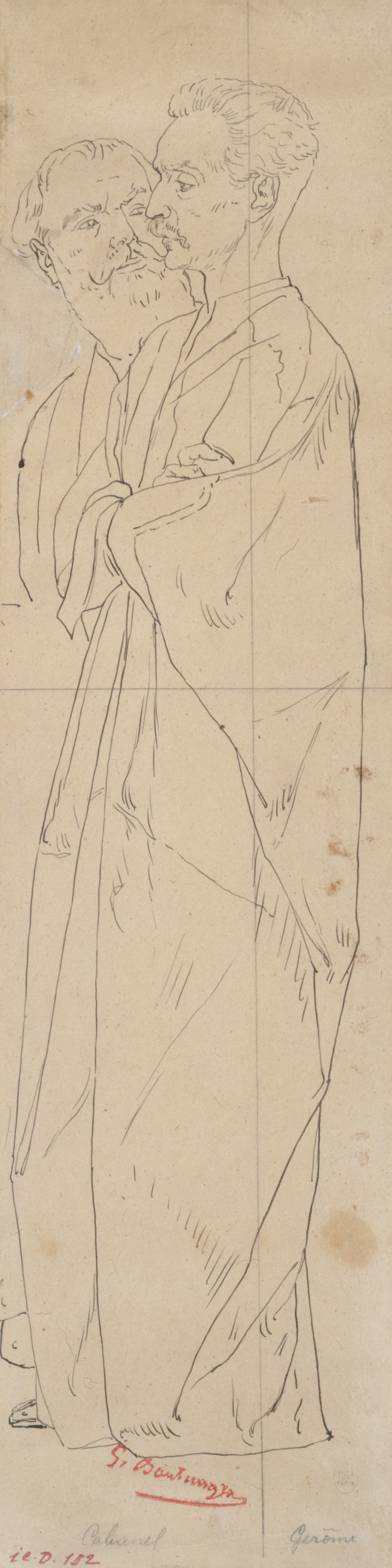
Cabanel,
Gérôme

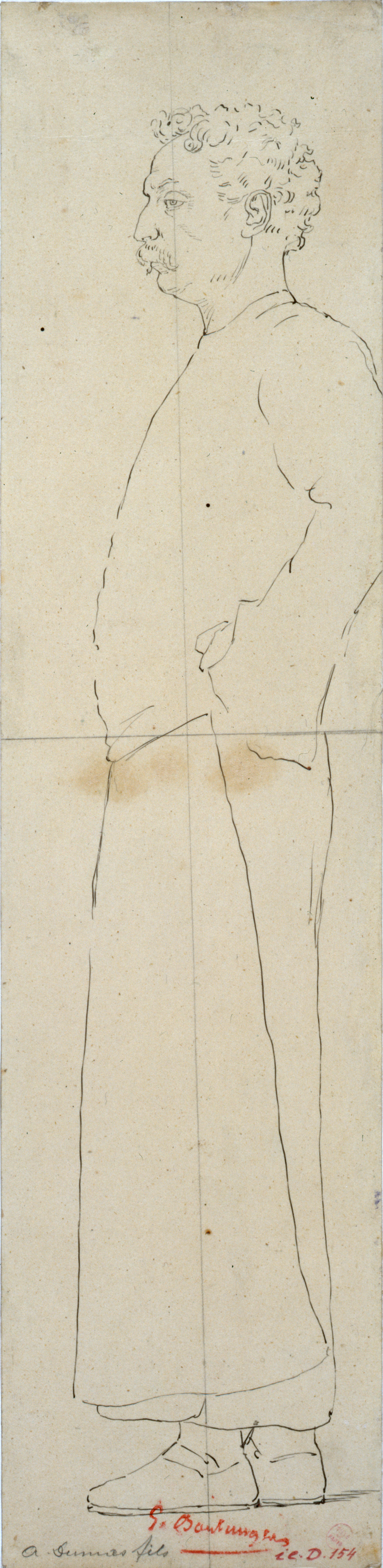
Dumas

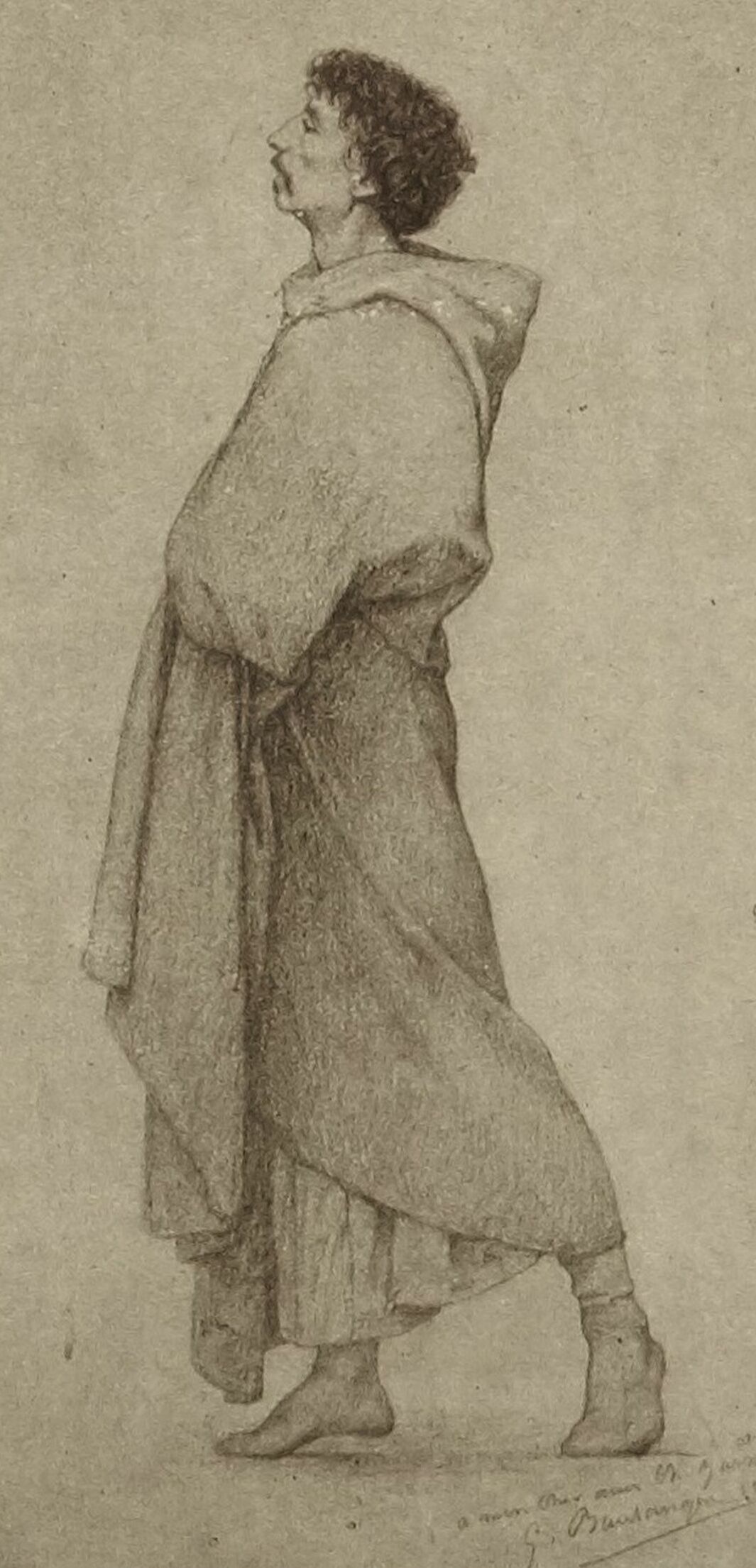
Garnier

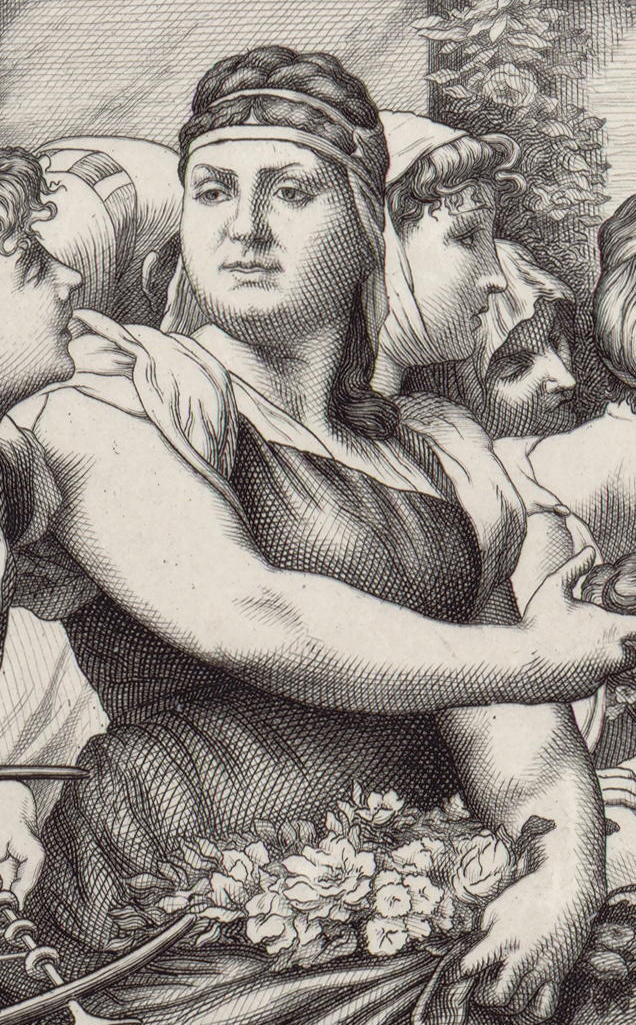
Mlle. Nathalie

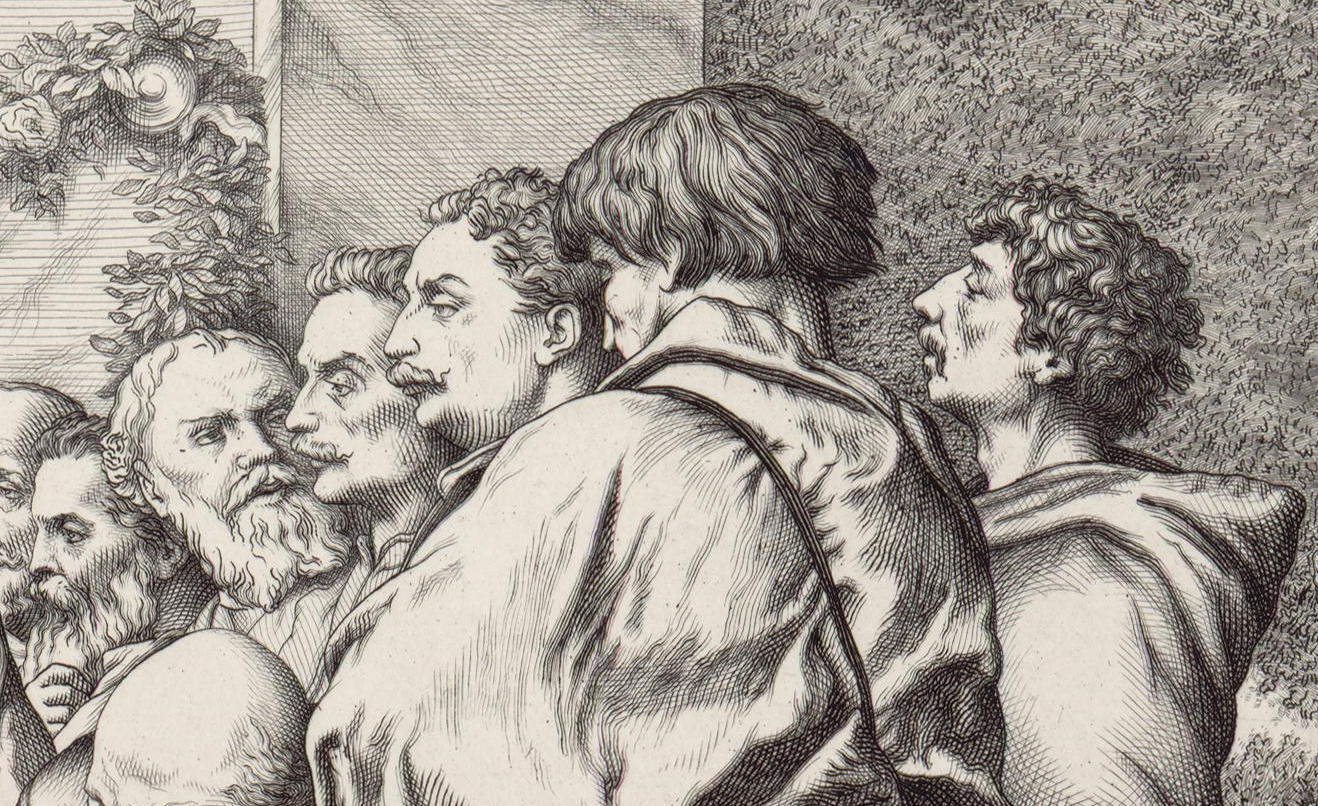
Meissonier, Cabanel, Gérôme, Dumas, an unknown figure, Garnier

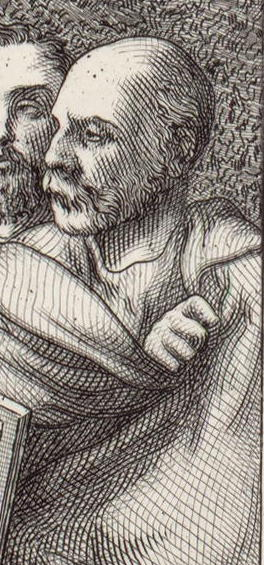
Self-portrait

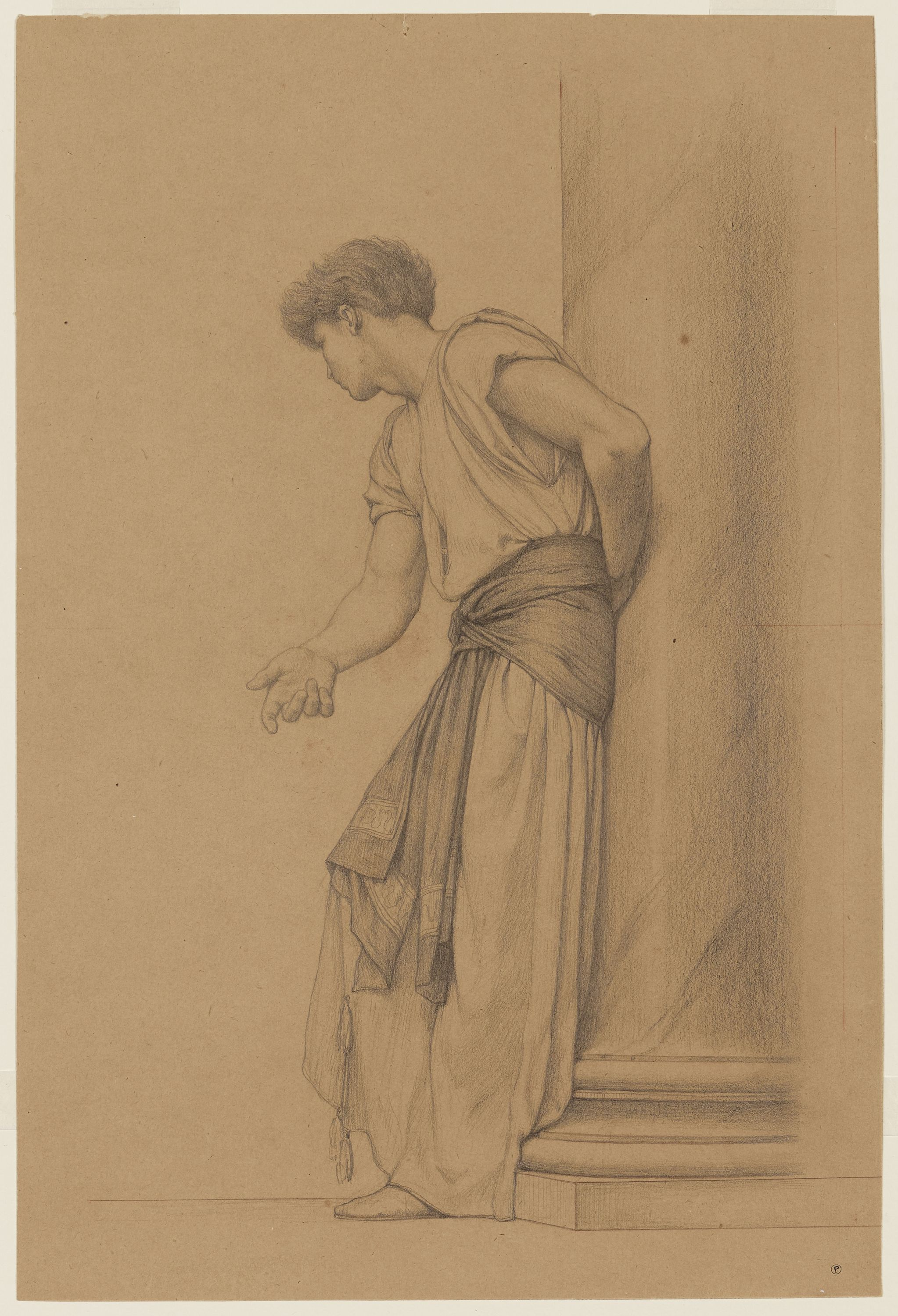
Youth leaning against pillar

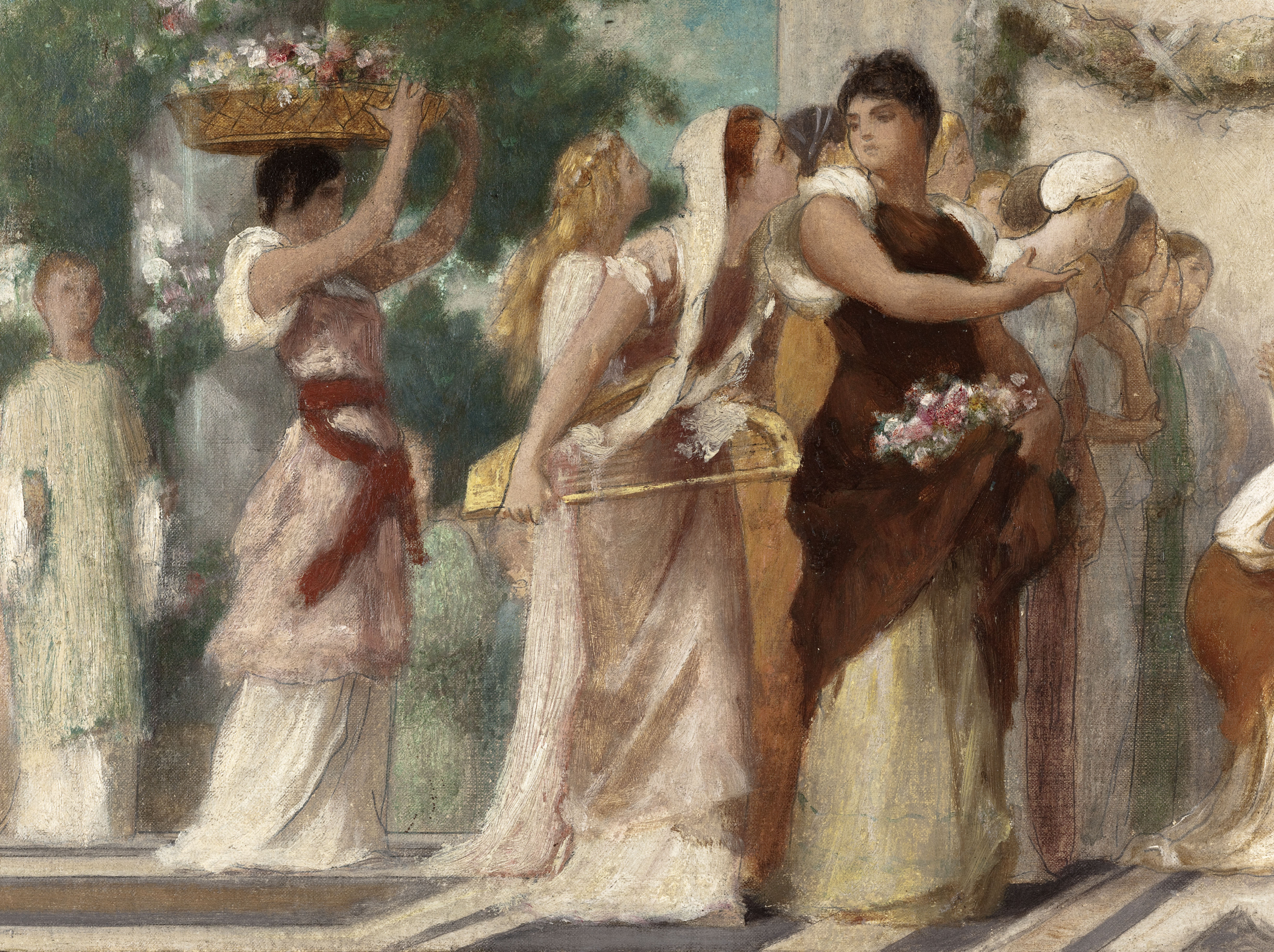
Preliminary plan, female figures

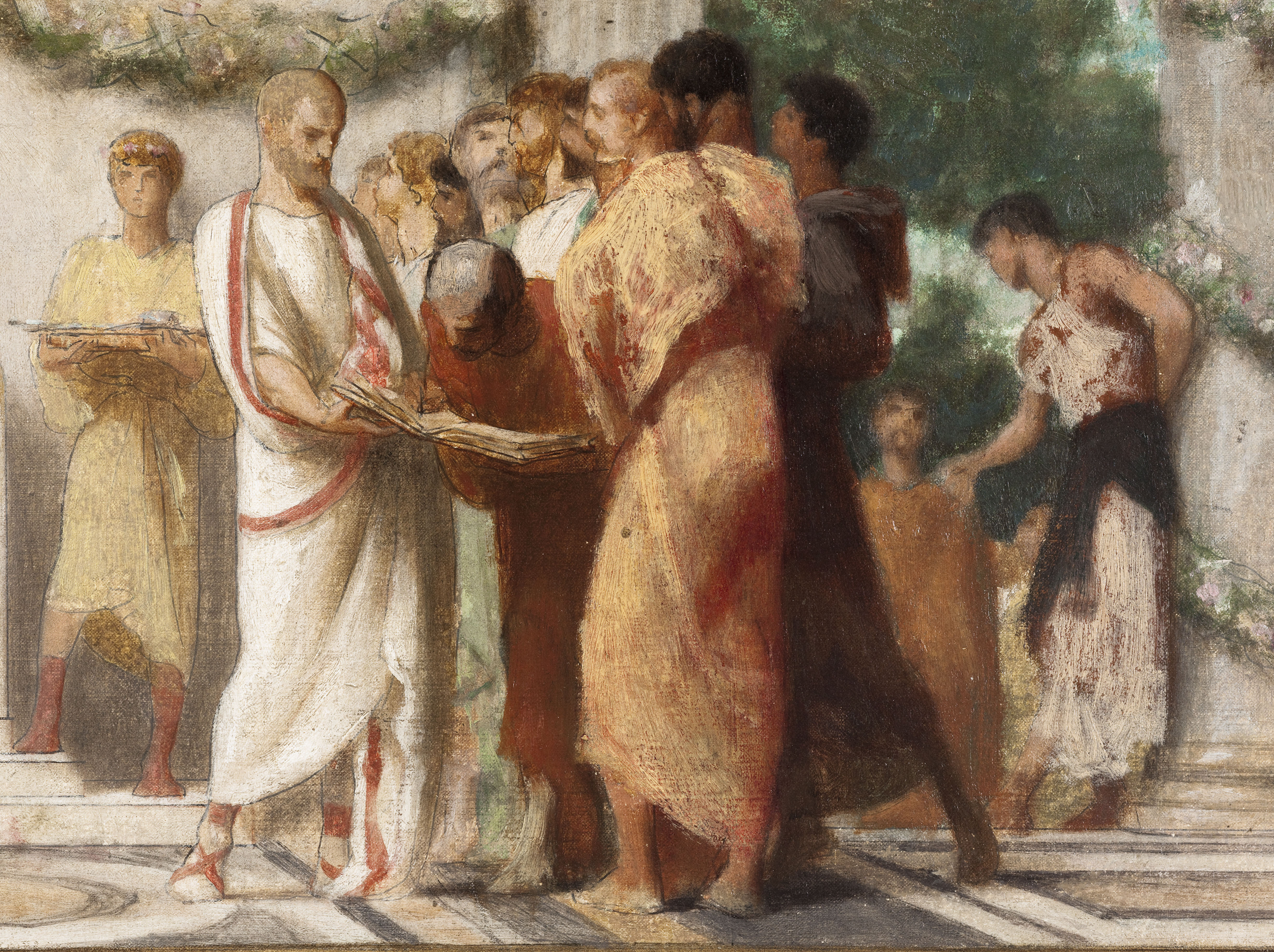
Preliminary plan, male figures

== Boulanger at auction ==
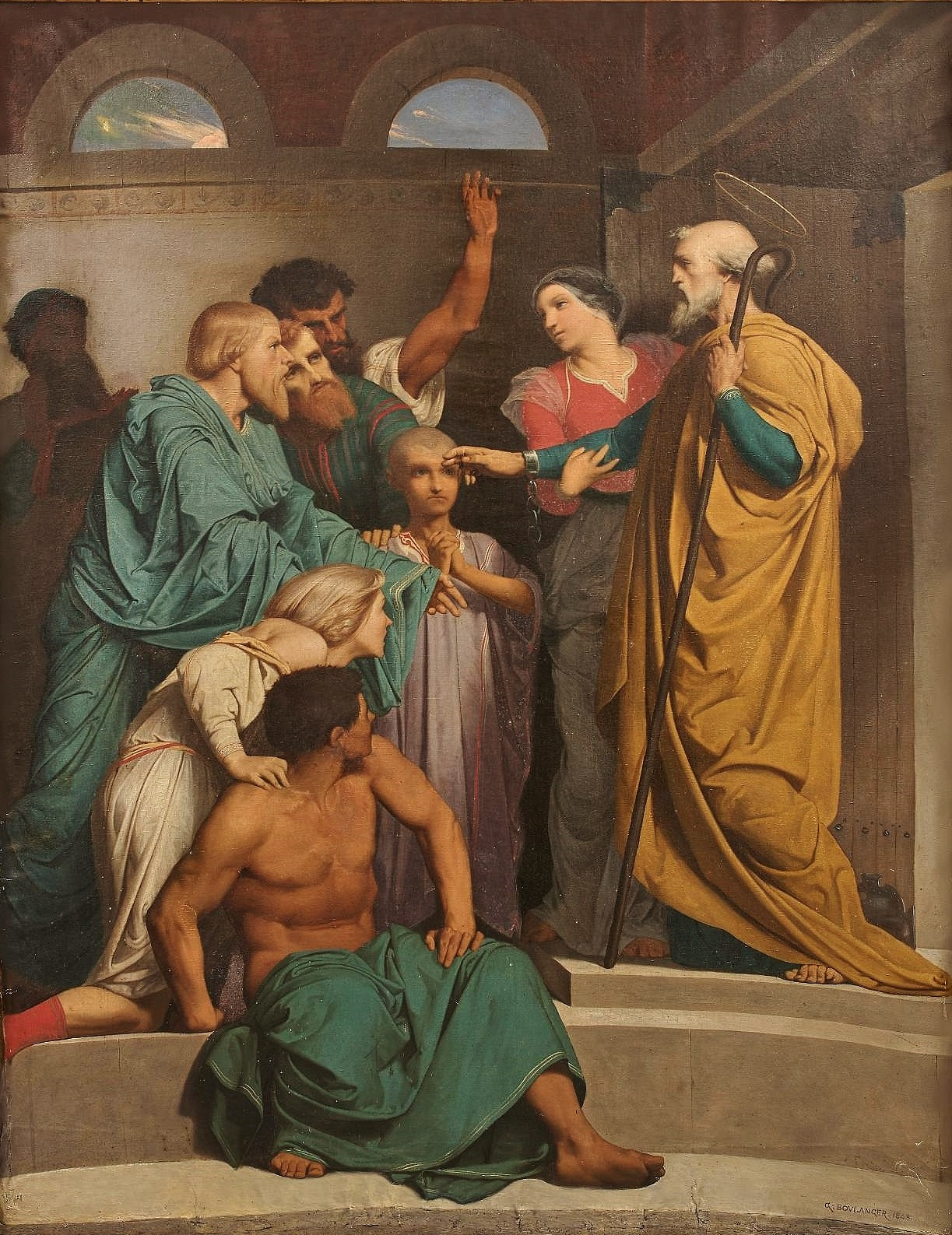
The rediscovered Saint Pierre chez Marie, 1848

A record for a Boulanger painting was set by La Cour du Palais de Dar Khdaouedj El Amia, Alger (1877), auctioned for $576,000 at Christie's in New York in 2005.

Other notable results include $265,250 for El Hiasseub, Conteur arabe (1868) in 2009, £119, 700 for The Prayer/La Prière (1871) in 2021, $66,000 for Catherine I of Russia Negotiating the Treaty of Prut with the Turks (1866) in 2006, €23,940 for Deux arabes assis (watercolor and charcoal) in 2023, €18,750 for Project de décor pour le Foyer de la Dansee à l'Opéra Garnier (a large pencil and watercolor study, before 1875) in 2008, and €11,256 for The Flowergirl (1888) in 2004.

In 1848, as a student, Boulanger submitted a painting for the Prix de Rome; the entry did not win (it came in second), and the painting, Saint Pierre introduit dans la maison de Marie, mère de Jean, also called Saint Pierre chez Marie, was believed lost for 171 years until it was rediscovered in the attic of an old house in a small hamlet in Creuse, France. The painting represents a rare example of religious art by Boulanger. France 3 television called it "la trouvaille de l'année" (the find of the year). It was auctioned at the Hôtel des Ventes in Guéret in November 2019 and realized €21,000.

== See also ==
- List of pupils of Gustave Boulanger
- List of Orientalist artists
- Orientalism

== Sources ==
- About, Edmond (1867). Salon de 1866, Paris: Hachette, 1867.
- Aubrun, Marie-Madeleine (1986). "Gustave Boulanger, peintre éclectique," Bulletin de la Société d'histoire de l'art français, no. 72, cat. 110, 1986, pp. 167–256; includes an essay by Aubrun, a chronology of Boulanger's life and career, and an illustrated catalogue raisonné of Boulanger's work.
- Blaugrund, Annette and Bowie, Joanne W. and Kellogg, Alice D. (1988). "Alice D. Kellogg: Letters from Paris, 1887–1889", Archives of American Art Journal, Vol. 28, No. 3, 1988, pp. 11–19.
- Boulanger, Gustave (1885). À nos élèves, text of a speech, Paris: A. Lahure, 1885.
- Boulanger, Gustave (1883). Notice sur M. Lehmann, speech memorializing Henri Lehmann (who died in Paris in 1882), delivered before the Académie des Beaux-Arts, session of 27 January 1883.
- Bouvet, Charles (1925). "Gustave Boulanger, Collaborateur de Charles Garnier à l'Opéra", Gazette des Beaux-Arts, Nov. 1925, pp. 301–311.
- Brookner, Anita (1962). "Current and Forthcoming Exhibitions: Paris" (includes review of Répétition du "Joueur de flûte"), The Burlington Magazine, vol. 104, no. 713, August, 1962, pp. 361–364.
- Chu, Petra ten-Doesschate (2013). "Public Commemoration and Private Memory: Félix Bracquemond vis-à-vis the Siege of Paris and the Commune", Getty Research Journal, No. 5, 2013, p. 74.
- Claretie, Jules (1896). "Un Livre Unique: l'Affaire Clemenceau Peinte et Illustrée" (reproduces two images drawn by Boulanger directly on the pages of a book by Alexandre Dumas fils), La Lecture, 10 April 1896, pp. 103–112.
- Couëlle, Colombe (2010). "Désirs d'Antique ou comment rêver le passé gréco-romain dans la peinture européenne de la seconde moitié du XIX e siècle", Anabases, No. 11 (2010), pp. 21–54.
- Du Pays, A. (1851), "Ecole des Beaux-Arts. Exposition des Grands Prix–Envoi des pensionnaires de l’Académie à Rome," L’Illustration, 9–16 October 1851, no. 450, vol. XVIII, pp. 227–228.
- Garnier, Charles (1868). Voyage en Espagne, original manuscript and drawings with the collaboration of Louise Bary Garnier, Gustave Boulanger, and Ambroise Baudry, Bibliothèque nationale de France.
- Garnier, Charles (2012). Journey to Spain, vol. 1 (English translation) and vol. 2 (facsimile of original ms. in French, with the collaboration of Louise Bary Garnier, Gustave Boulanger, and Ambroise Baudry), Donostia-San Sebastián, Spain: Nerea, 2012.
- Garnier, Charles (1875). Le nouvel Opéra de Paris: Peintures Décoratives (paintings by Boulanger for the Foyer de la Danse, plates 2–7), Paris: Duchet & Cie., 1875.
- Gautier, Théophile (1861). "Boulanger (Gustave)" in Abécédaire du Salon de 1861, Paris: 1861, p. 67-71.
- Gautier, T., Houssaye, A., nd Coligny, C. (1866). Le palais pompéien de l'avenue Montaigne: études sur la maison grécoromaine, ancienne résidence duprince Napoléon, Paris, 1866.
- Gold, Arthur & Fizdale, Robert (1991). The Divine Sarah: A Life of Sarah Bernhardt, New York: Knopf.
- "Le Gynécée. From a Painting by Gustave Boulanger", The Art Journal, New Series, Vol. 2, 1876, pp. 266–267.
- Hanselaar, Saskia (2016). "La maison pompéienne de Joseph Napoléon par Gustave Boulanger", Histoire par l'image, posted May 2016.
- Haseltine Galleries (1874). Catalogue of Mr. Charles F. Haseltine's Collection of Oil Paintings and Aquarelles, Philadelphia: 1874, Boulanger entries (The Pompeian Maid, no. 206, and Hercules at the Feet of Omphale, no. 308), pp. 37 and 59.
- Hooper, Lucy H. (1878). "The Exhibition at Les Mirlitons" (Boulanger's The Home of the Cadi: a Reminiscence of Algiers in the Olden Times described), The Art Journal, New Series, Vol. 4, 1878, pp. 122–124.
- Jagot, Hélène (2013). La Peinture Nó-Grecque (1847–1874); Réflexions sur la constitution d’une catégorie stylistique, Theses pour obtenir le grade de Docteur (en Histoire de l'art) de l'Université de Paris-Ouest Nanterre La Défense.
- Javel, Firmin (1888). "Gustave Boulanger", L'Art français, no. 76, 6 Oct. 1888, p. 4.
- Javel, Firmin (1889). Catalogue des oeuvres de Gustave Boulanger, Paris, 1889.
- Lan, Jules (1883). Mémoires d'un chef de claque: souvenirs des théatres, Paris: Librairie Nouvelle, 1883.
- Leeuw, Ronald de (1996). "Gustave Boulanger. Phryne: courtisane en beeldhouwersmodel," Van Gogh Bulletin, 11 (1996) 3, pp. 10–13.
- Legrand Caroline (2019). "Une peinture de concours", La Gazette Drouot, 23 October 2019.
- Mirbeau, Octave (1885, 1993). "La tristesse de Monsieur Boulanger," La France, 13 April 1885; reprinted in Mirbeau, Combats esthétiques, Paris: Nouvelles Editions Séguier, 1993, vol. 1, pp. 150–153.
- Montrosier, Eugène (1881). Les Artistes Modernes, vol. I (Boulanger chapter, pp. 21–24), Paris: H.Launette, 1881.
- Montrosier, Eugène (1888). "Gustave Boulanger, Revue Illustrée, v. 6, no. 69, 15 Oct. 1888, pp. 274–280.
- Safran, Linda (1980). "A Note on Boulanger's Répétition Générale du Joueur de Flûte," Gazette des Beaux-Arts, 6, no. 96, November 1980, pp. 185–6.
- Shinn, Earl (1881). Modern French Art, New York: A.W. Lovering, 1881.
- Spielmann, M.H. (1889). "Gustave Boulanger", The Magazine of Art, vol. XII, 1889, pp. 70–72.
- Weidinger, Corina (2006). Imperial Desire and Classical Revival: Gustave Boulanger's Rehearsal of "The Flute Player", thesis submitted to the Faculty of the University of Delaware, 2006.
- White, Clara M. (1899). "A Western Art Collection" (image and critique of Boulanger's Daily News Reading before the Barber Shop of Licinius), Brush and Pencil, Vol. 4, No. 4, July 1899, pp. 181–191.
- Wien, Jo Ann (1981). The Parisian Training of American Women Artists, Woman's Art Journal, Vol. 2, No. 1, Spring-Summer 1981, p. 42.
