= Weissenberg =

Weissenberg or Weißenberg may refer to:

- Weißenberg, a town in Saxony, Germany
- the scene of the Battle of White Mountain
- Weißenberg (Frankenweide), a hill in Rhineland-Pfalz, Germany

== People with the surname ==
- Alexis Weissenberg (1929-2012), Bulgarian-born French pianist
- Carola Weißenberg (1962), German figure skater
- Isaac Meir Weissenberg (1881-1938), Yiddish short story writer
- Joseph Weißenberg (1855-1941), German religious and social reformer
- Karl Weissenberg (1893-1976), German physicist and founding rheologist
- Samuel Weissenberg (1867–1928), Russian-Jewish anthropologist
- Sophie Weißenberg (1997), German multi-discipline athlete

== See also ==
- Weissenberg effect and Weissenberg number, both named after Karl Weissenberg
- Weissenberge
- Weissenberger (disambiguation)
- Weissenburg (disambiguation)
