= Drolling =

Drolling is an archaic term for the act of playing the fool.

It is also a surname.

== People with surname Drolling ==
- Michel Martin Drolling (1789–1851), French painter
- Martin Drolling (1752–1817), French painter, father of Michel
