= Portrait of Adéone =

Painting by Martin Drolling

- Portrait d'Adéone (French)
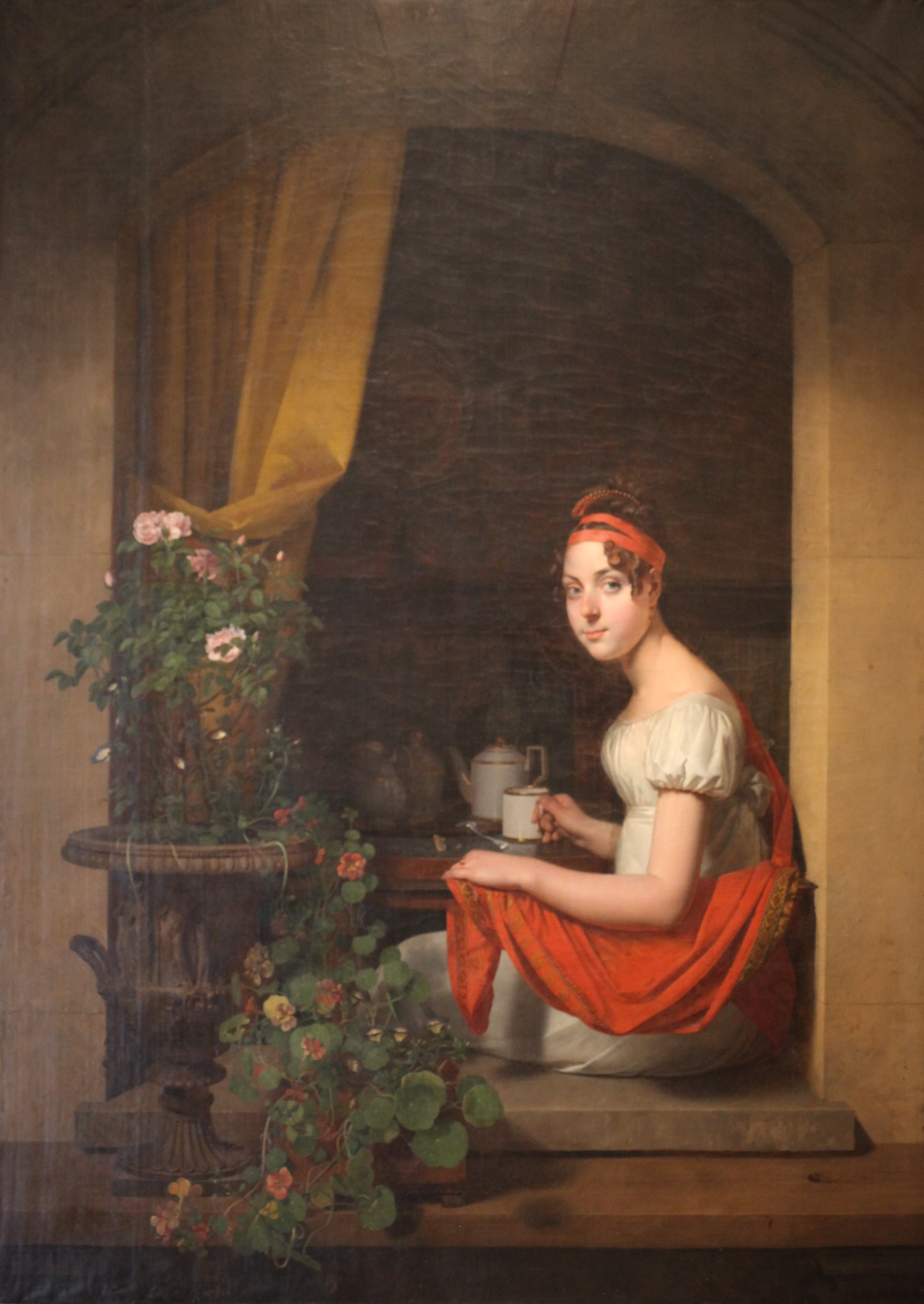
- Artist: Martin Drolling
- Year: 1812
- Medium: oil paint on canvas
- Movement: Portrait painting French Neoclassicism
- Subject: Louise-Adéone Drölling
- Dimensions: 193 cm × 141 cm (76 in × 56 in)
- Location: Musée des Beaux-Arts, Strasbourg
- Accession: 1972

Portrait of Adéone (French: Portrait d'Adéone) is an oil painting by the French artist Martin Drolling (aka Drölling). It is a life-sized depiction of his daughter Louise-Adéone shortly after her 15th birthday. The painting belongs to the Musée des Beaux-Arts of Strasbourg, France. Its inventory number is 2411.

In a letter from 13 June 1812 to her brother Michel Martin Drolling, Louise-Adéone states that the painting is currently being made and that it will be exhibited at that year's Salon de Paris "if there is no obstacle" (si rien ne s'y oppose). She also complains about her hand being tired from holding the teacup.

The painting was exhibited at the Salon of 1812 under the title Un portrait de femme (A portrait of woman).

Portrait of Adéone is Martin Drölling's largest work. Not content with depicting the "charming physiognomy" of his daughter, he also makes a spectacular display of his talents as a flower painter and as a designer of porcelain. The actual tea service seen in the painting is now kept in the Musée des Arts décoratifs.

== Gallery ==
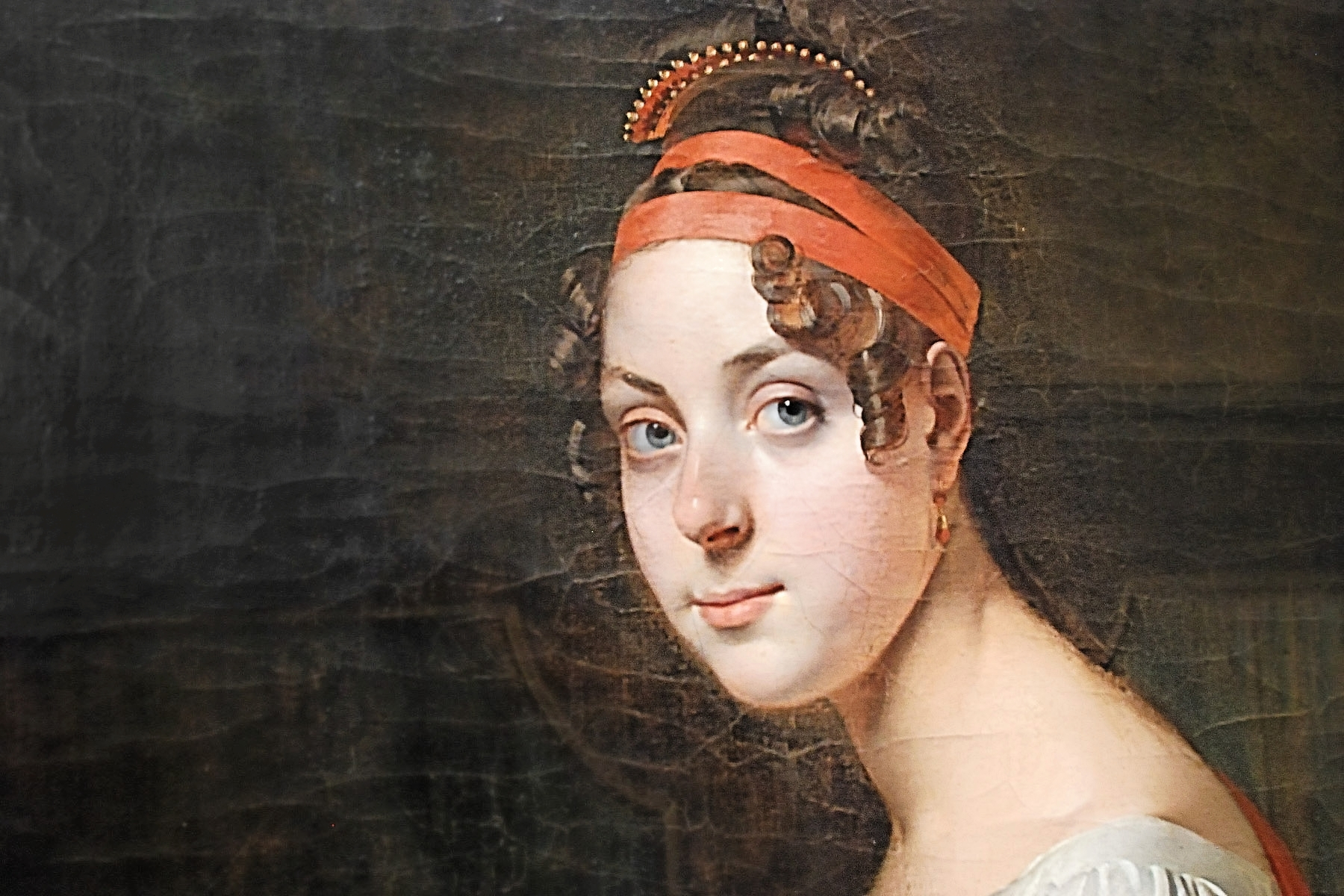
Detail of the painting – the head

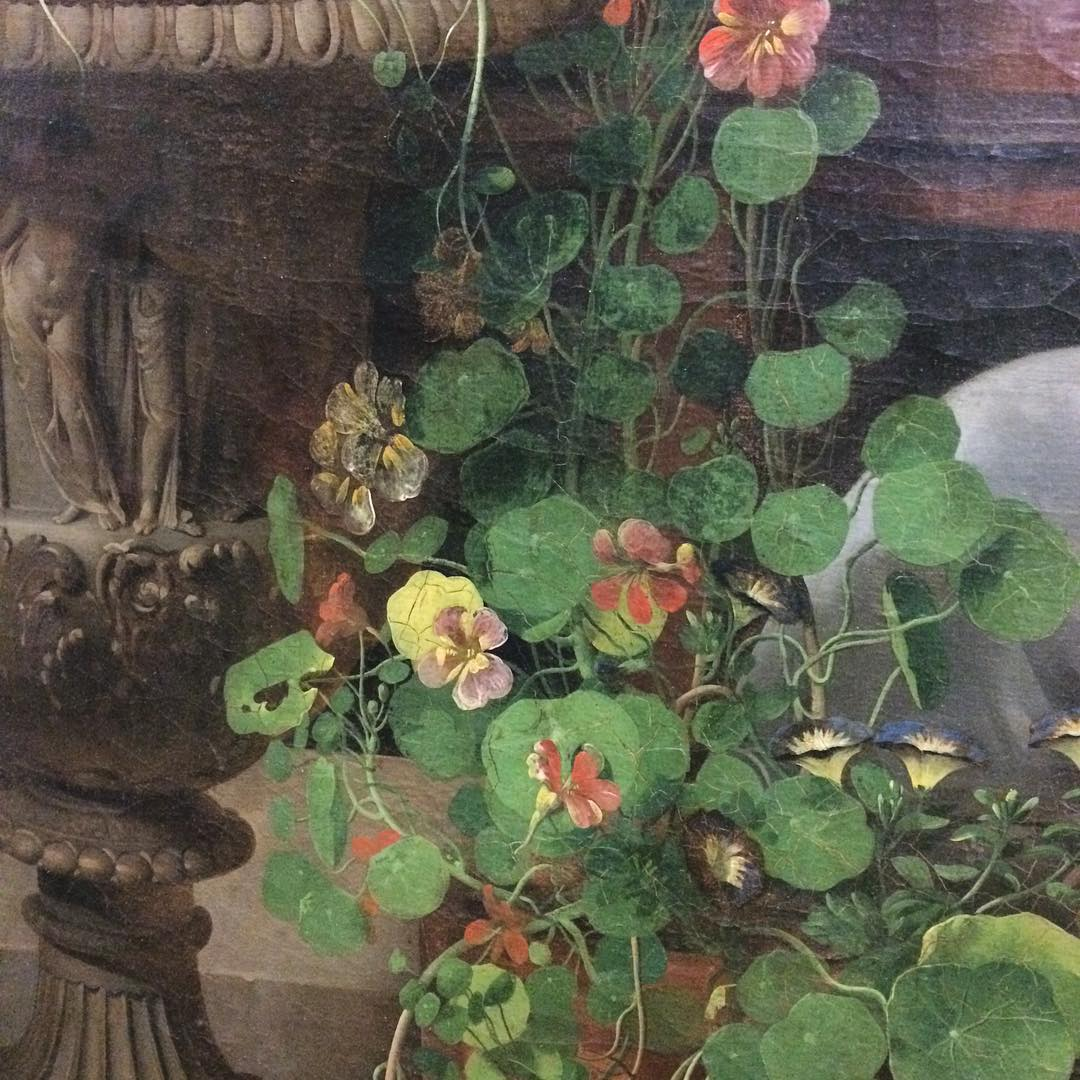
Detail of the painting – the plant

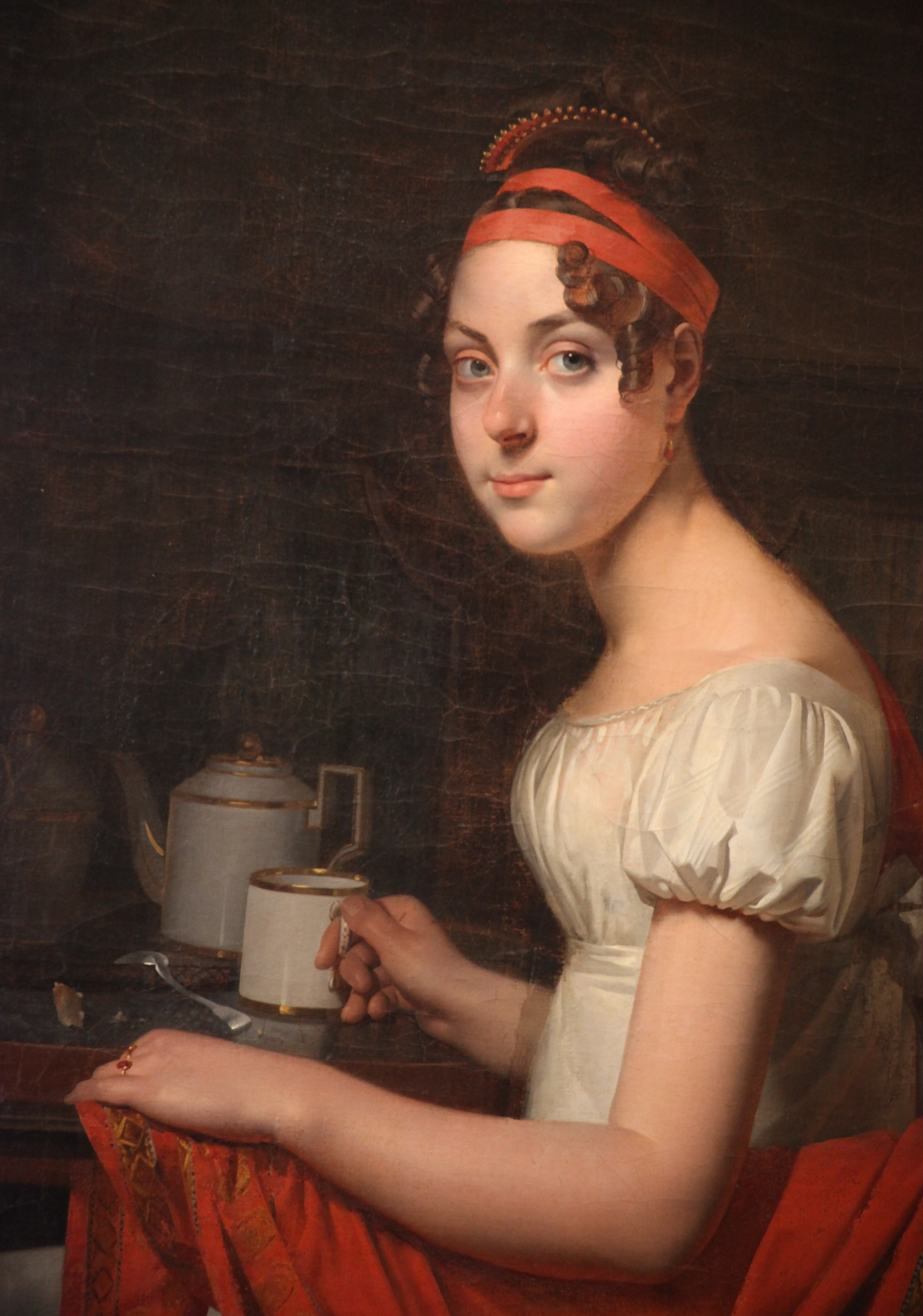
Adéone holding the teacup
