= Weisenburger =

Weisenburger is a surname. Notable people with the surname include:

- Edward Weisenburger (born 1960), American Roman Catholic bishop
- Jack Weisenburger (1926–2019), American football and baseball player
- Jack Weisenburger (baseball) (born 1997), American baseball player

== See also ==
- Weisenberger
- Weissenberger
