= Weisenberger =

Weisenberger is a German surname. Notable people with this surname include:

- Elvira Weisenberger (born 1949), Argentinian tennis player
- Gerhard Weisenberger (born 1952), German wrestler
- Jack Weisenberger (1926–2019), American football and baseball player
- John Weisenberger, Guam attorney general
- Karl Weisenberger (1890–1952), German general

== See also ==
- Weisenburger
- Weissenberger
