= Armand Laroche =

French painter

- Born: 1826
- Died: 1903 (aged 76–77)
- Education: École des beaux-arts de Versailles; École nationale supérieure des Beaux-Arts; Ferdinand Wachsmuth; Michel Martin Drolling
- Known for: Painter

Armand Laroche (1826 – 1903), also known as Amand Laroche, was a French painter, who specialized in portraits and genre painting.

== Biography ==
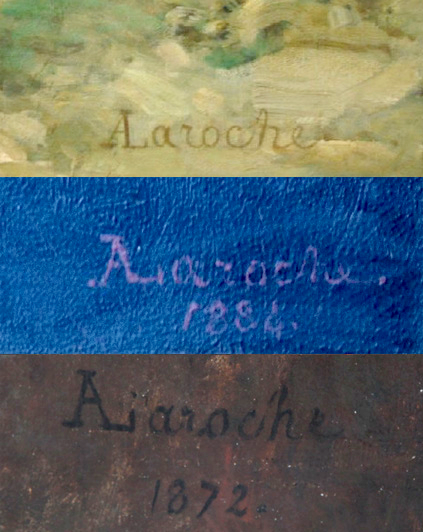
Painted signature of the artist

Born in Saint-Cyr-l'École (Seine-et-Oise). Arman Laroche was studying at École des beaux-arts de Versailles and École des beaux-arts de Paris, he was student of Ferdinand Wachsmuth and Michel Martin Drolling. He took part in the Paris Salon every year from 1846 up to 1903. He was awarded a bronze medal at the Exposition Universelle (1889), and an honourable mention at the Exposition Universelle (1900).

== Works ==
- Portrait of Sculptor Poitevin (1855), Musée des beaux-arts de Marseille
- Portrait of a Young Woman (1872)
- Blue Bird, featured at the Salon of 1882
- Portrait of L-F Schützenberger (1884)
- Le Réveil, featured at the Salon in 1886
- Portrait of M. Lapostolet, featured at the Salon in 1887
- Portrait of Melle Lainé, Artist of the Odeon, featured at the salon in 1888
- La Rosée, featured at the Salon in 1889
- Baigneuse, featured at the Salon in 1892
- Female Nude by Pond With Water Lilies
- Diana Bathing With the Nymphs

== Gallery ==
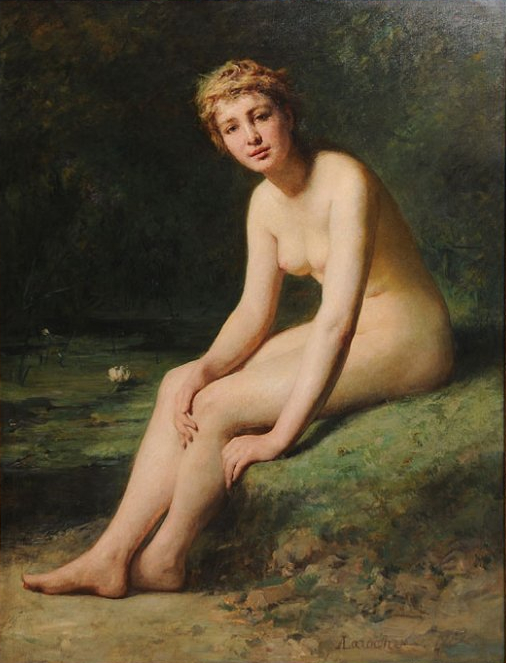
Female nude by pond with water lilies

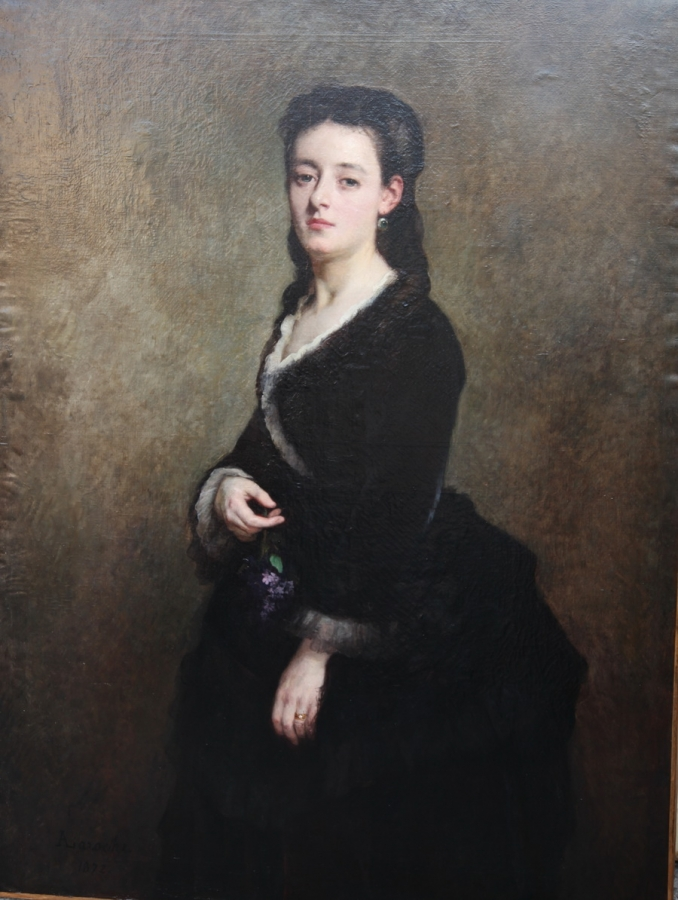
Portrait of young woman (1872)

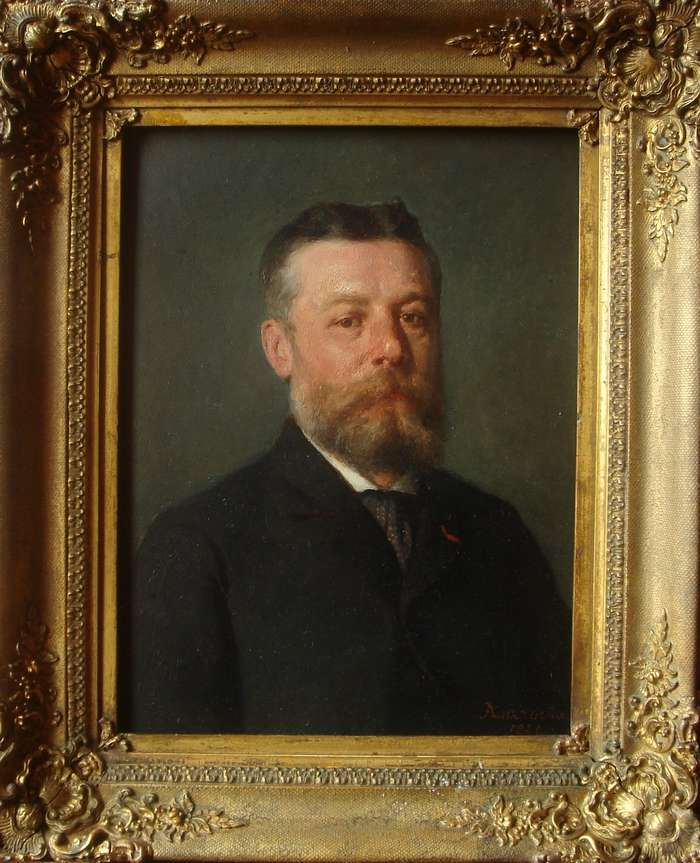
Portrait of L.-F. Schützenberger (1884)

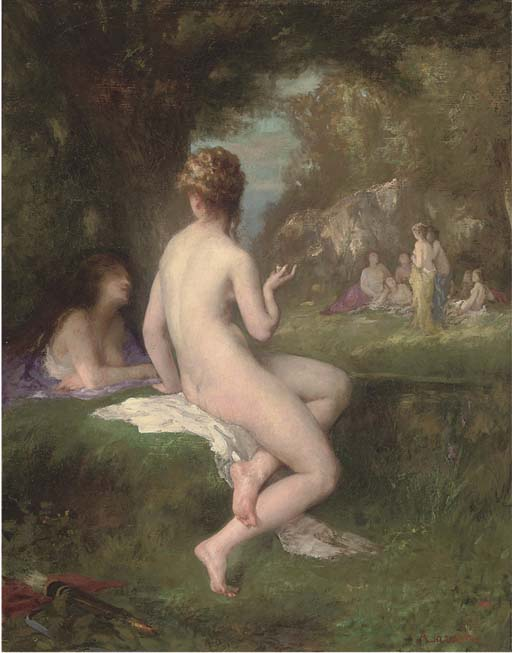
Diana Bathing with the Nymphs
