= Louise-Adéone Drölling =

French painter

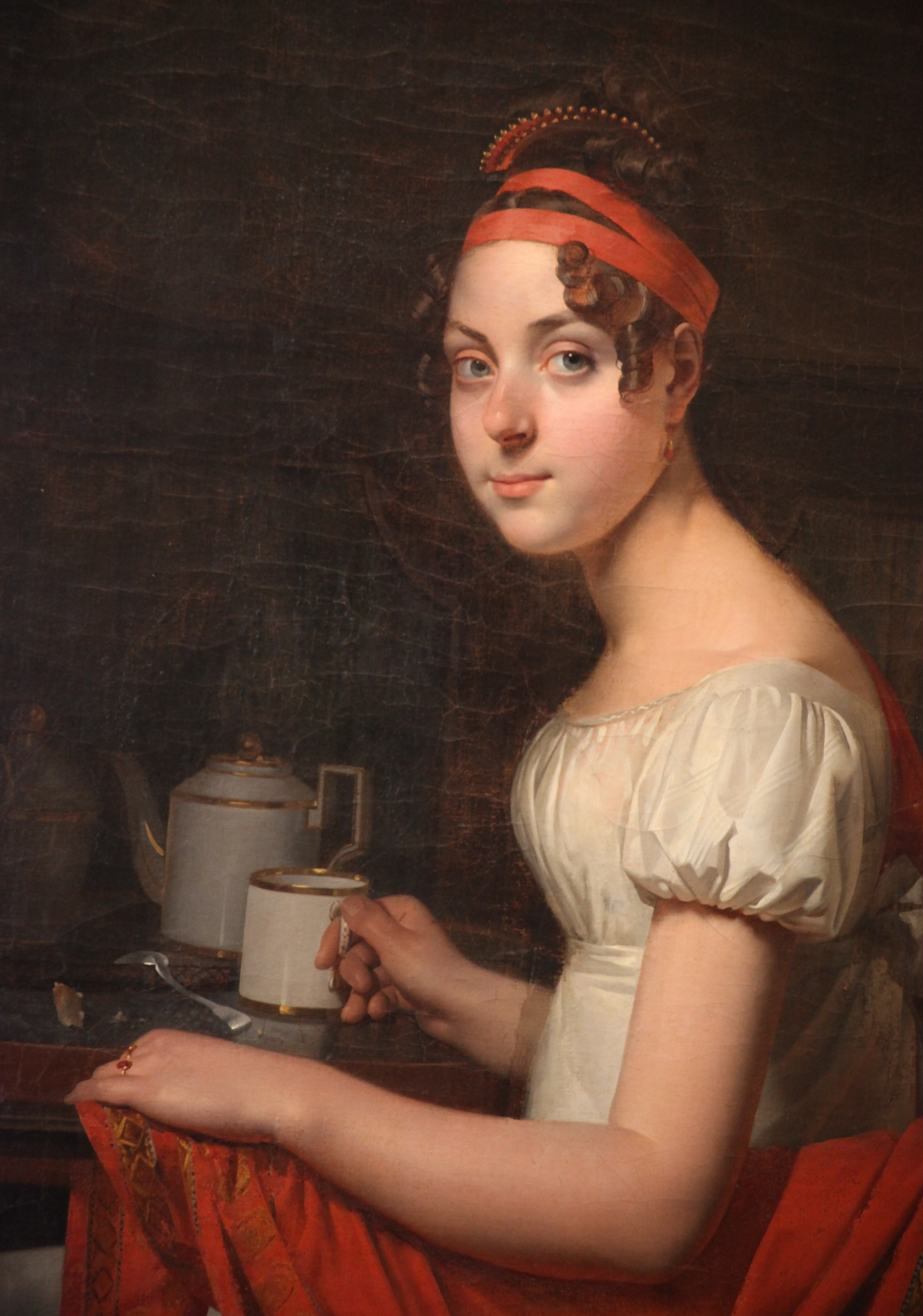
- Portrait of Adéone by her father (detail), 1812
- Born: 29 May 1797; Paris, France
- Died: 20 March 1834 (aged 36); Paris, France
- Other name: Madame Joubert
- Occupation: Painter
- Father: Martin Drolling
- Relatives: Michel Martin Drolling (brother)

Louise-Adéone Drölling, also known as Madame Joubert (French: [lwiz adeɔn dʁøliŋ]; 29 May 1797 – 20 March 1834) was a French painter and draughtswoman. Both her father, Martin Drolling, and her older brother, Michel Martin Drolling, were celebrated artists in their day.

== Biography ==
Louise-Adéone Drölling was born 29 May 1797. At about age 10, she modeled for her father for the small Portrait of the Artist's Daughter (Musée Magnin, Dijon), and later, at age 15, for the life-sized Portrait of Adéone (Musée des Beaux-Arts, Strasbourg). Around this time, she was encouraged by her father to begin a career in painting.

In 1819, Louise-Adéone married the architect Jean-Nicolas Pagnierre. She became a widow in 1822 and remarried four years later, in 1826. With her second husband, chief tax officer (octroi) of the city of Paris, Nicholas Roch Joubert (son of politician and former bishop Pierre-Mathieu Joubert), she had two daughters, Adéone Louise Sophie, and Angélique Marie.

In 1827 and 1831 Louise-Adéone's paintings were exhibited in the Salon des Amis des Arts. For one of her works, Interior with Young Woman Tracing a Flower, she received a gold medal and the work was displayed at the Gallery of La Duchesse de Berry.

She died in Paris, 20 March 1834.

The list of her belongings after her death (inventaire après décès) was made on 30 April 1836.

== Characteristics ==
Drölling was not a prolific artist, as she admitted herself in a letter from 1828; the inventory after her death mentions only a dozen of her works. Having been taught by her father (who had also been the teacher of her brother), she practiced a highly skillful but very traditional art; thus, some of her paintings and drawings have been attributed to either of both men, and vice versa. In addition to the two portraits he painted of her, Martin Drolling used Louise-Adéone's recognizable, brown-haired and blue-eyed features in several of his later paintings. Conversely, no self-portrait of Drölling has as yet been identified.

== Gallery ==
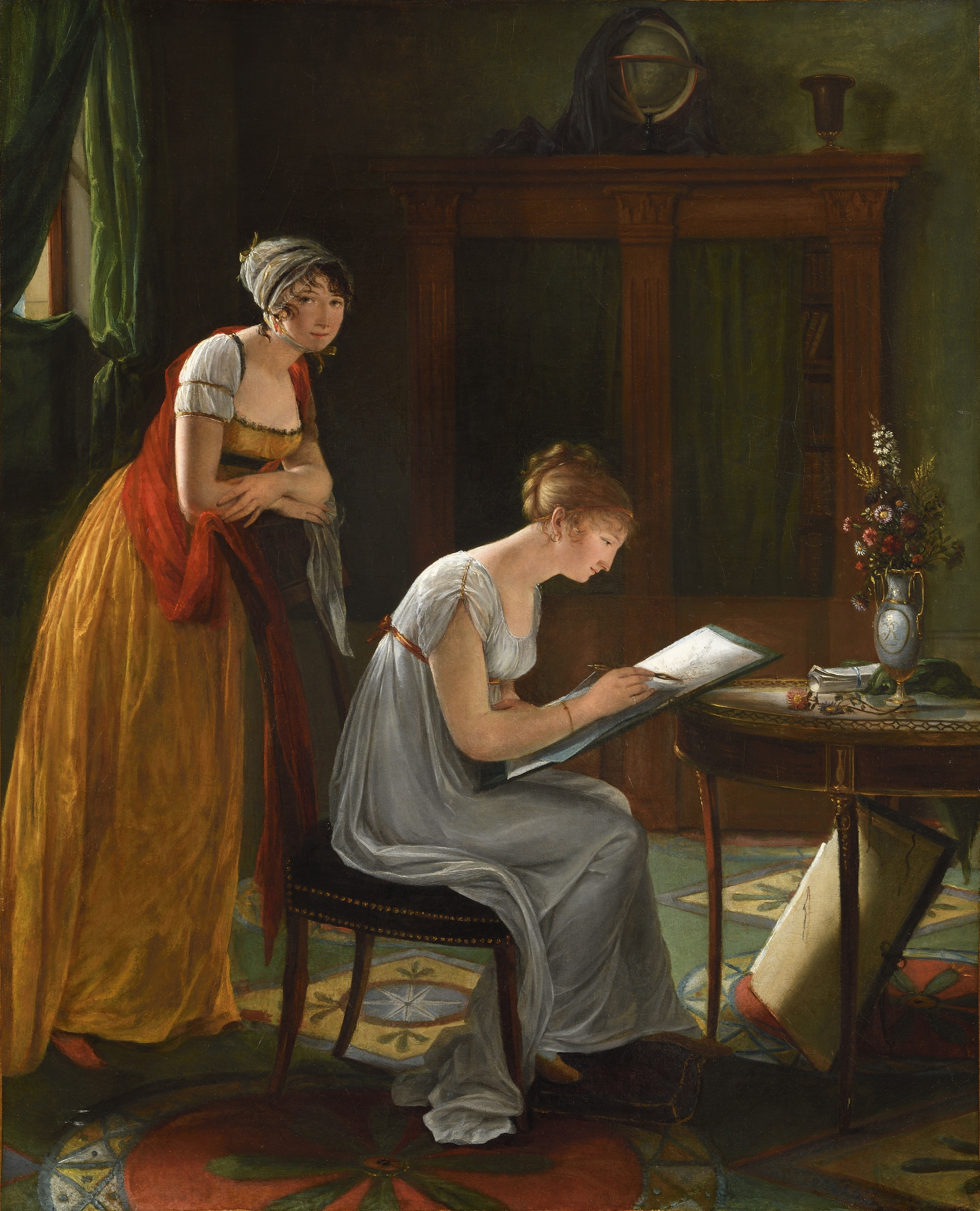
Woman artist giving a drawing lesson (Self-portrait), Art Gallery of South Australia, Adelaide

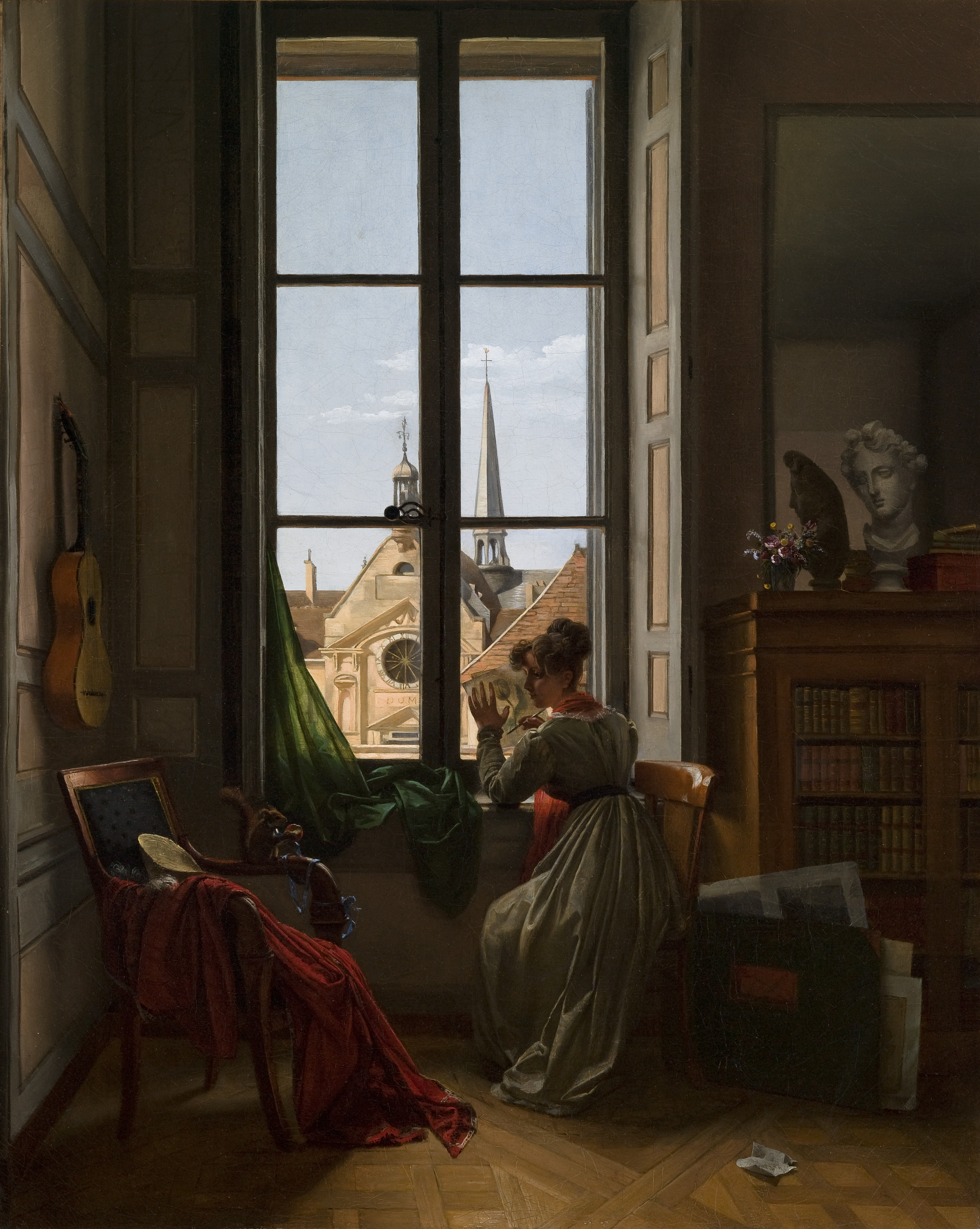
Interior with Young Woman Tracing a Flower, c. 1820-22, Saint Louis Art Museum, Saint Louis, Missouri

The Captured Mouse, Salon of 1827

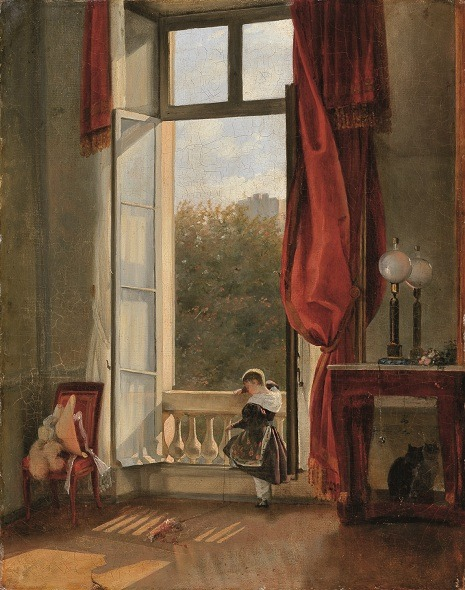
A Child in a Room, before 1831

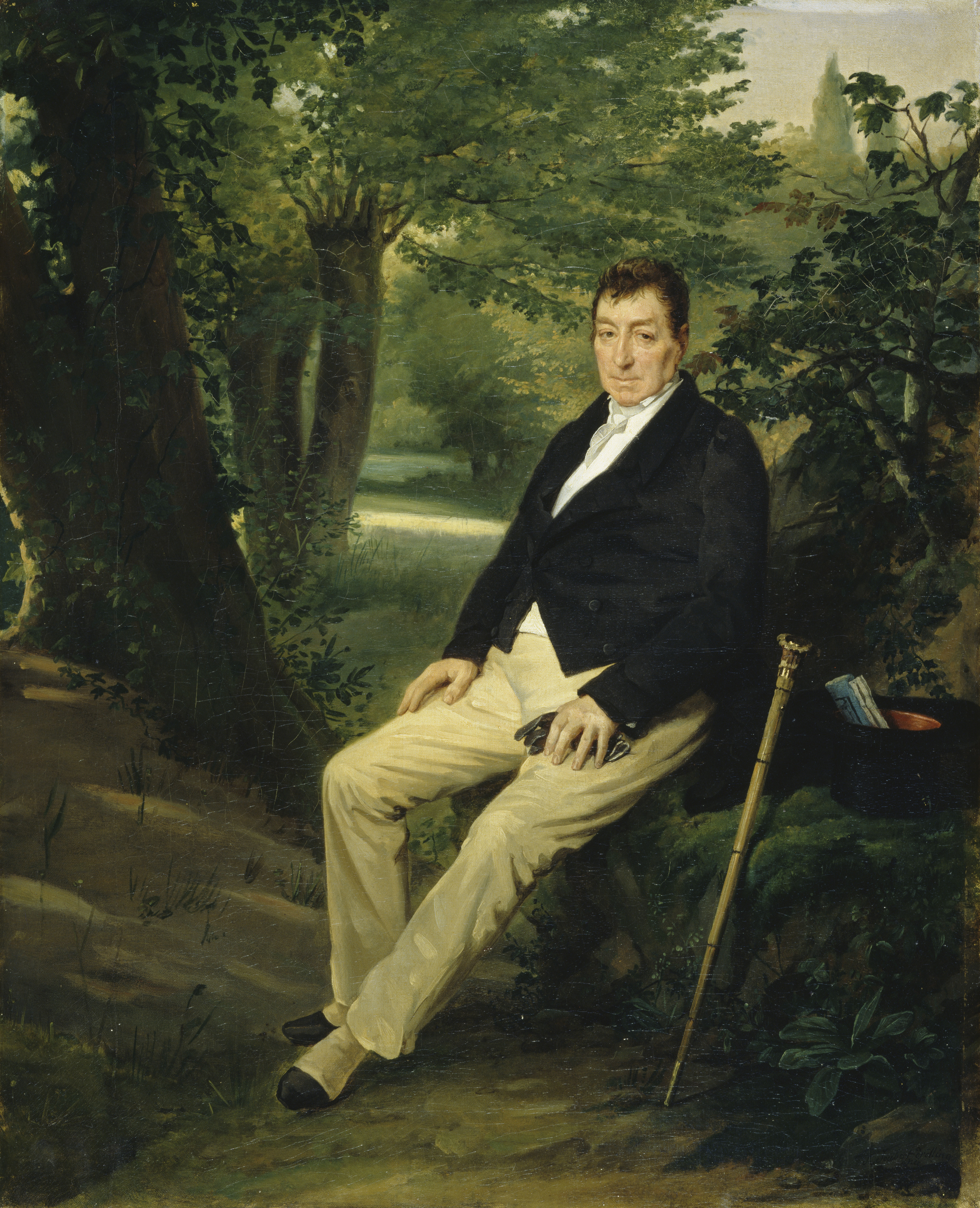
Lafayette in the Park of Château de la Grange-Bléneau, 1830, Musée de l'armée, Paris

== Portraits ==
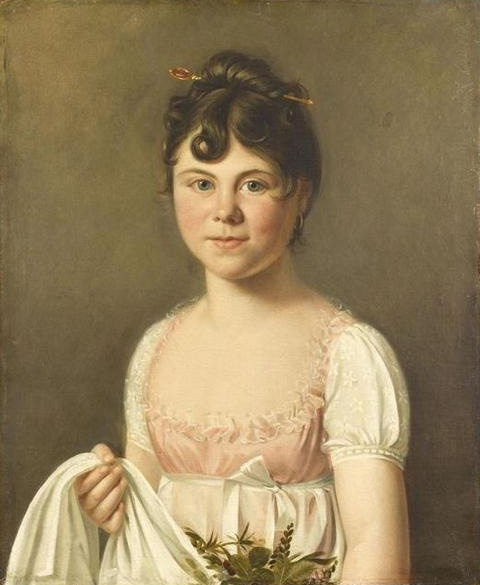
Martin Drolling: Portrait of the Artist's Daughter (1807 or slightly before)

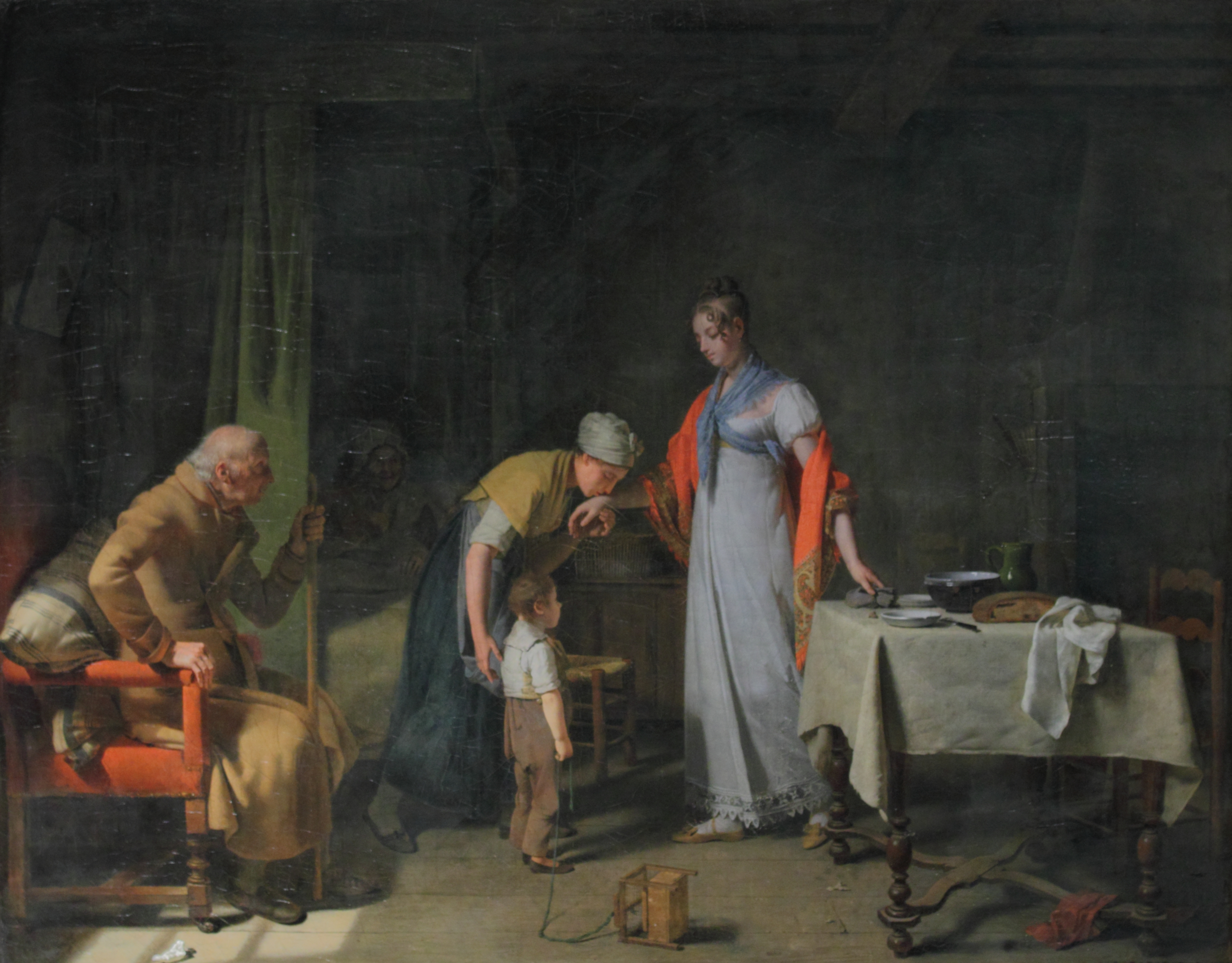
Martin Drolling, Young Woman helping a poor Family, 1814, Musée des Beaux-Arts de Caen. Louise-Adéone (aged 16–17) as the young woman.
