= Mummy brown =

Historical pigment made with mummified remains

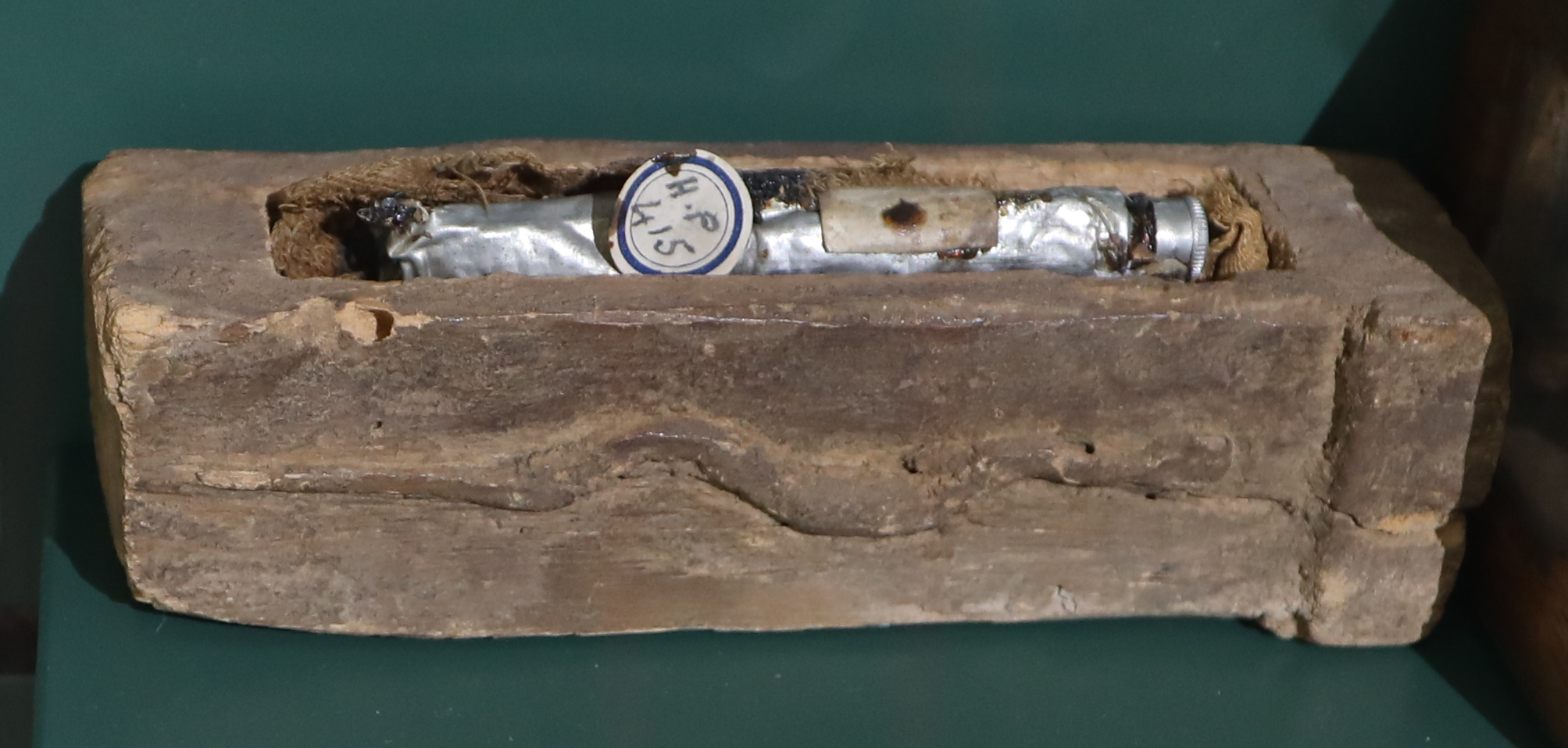
- A tube of mummy brown in a coffin

Colour coordinates
- Hex triplet: #824B27
- sRGB^{B} (r, g, b): (130, 75, 39)
- HSV (h, s, v): (24°, 70%, 51%)
- CIELCh_{uv} (L, C, h): (38, 50, 33°)
- B: Normalized to [0–255] (byte)

Mummy Brown
#824B27

Mummy brown, also known as Egyptian brown or Caput Mortuum, is a shade of brown with good transparency, sitting between burnt umber and raw umber in tint. Its bituminous pigment was made from the flesh of mummies mixed with white pitch and myrrh. Mummy brown was extremely popular from the mid-eighteenth to the nineteenth centuries, predominantly with Western European artists. However, fresh supplies of mummies diminished, and artists were less satisfied with the pigment's permanency and finish. By 1915, demand had significantly declined. Suppliers ceased to offer it by the middle of the twentieth century.

Mummy brown was one of the favourite colours of the Pre-Raphaelites. It was used by many artists, including Eugène Delacroix, William Beechey, Edward Burne-Jones, Lawrence Alma-Tadema, and Martin Drolling.

== History ==
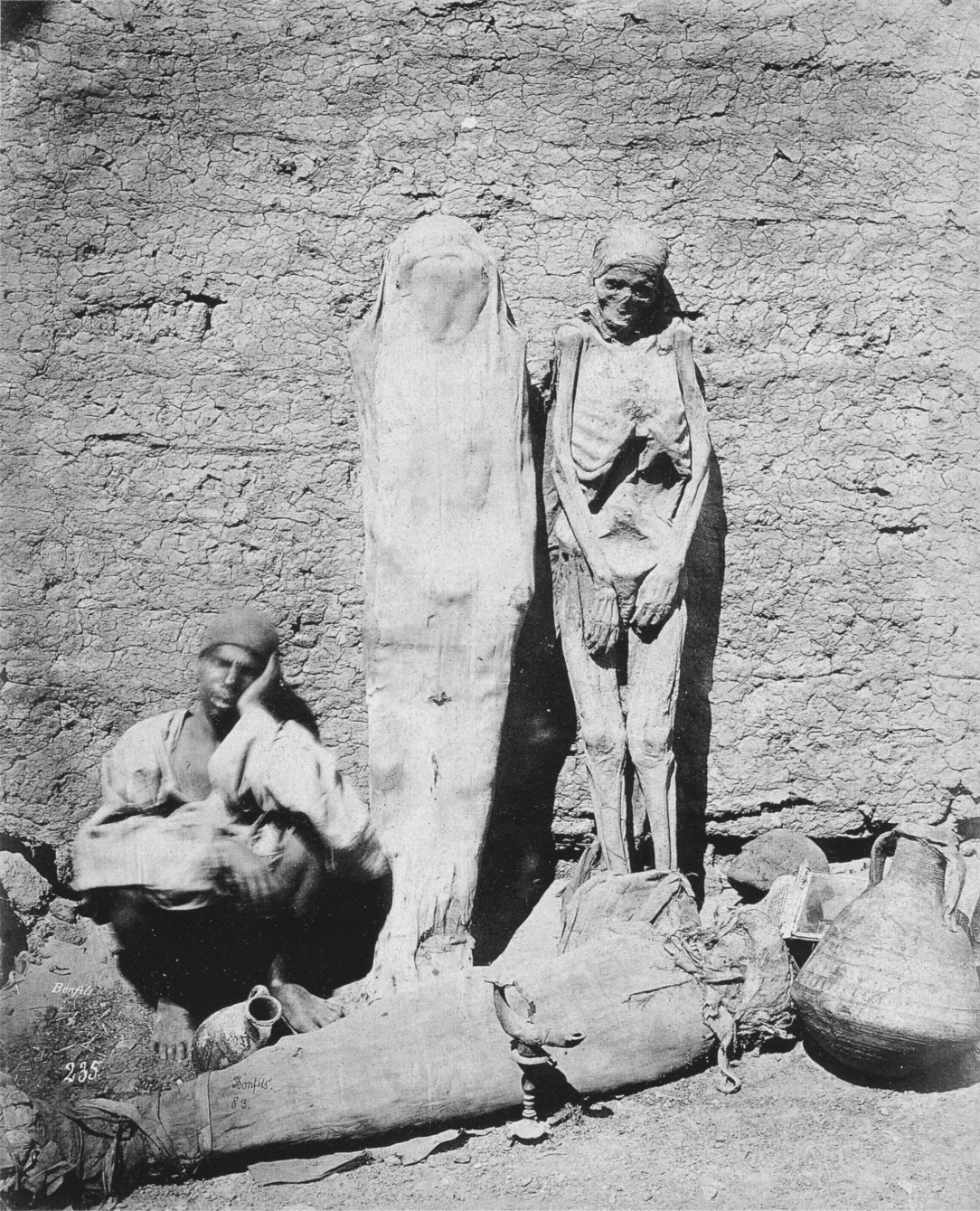
Egyptian mummy seller (1875, Félix Bonfils)

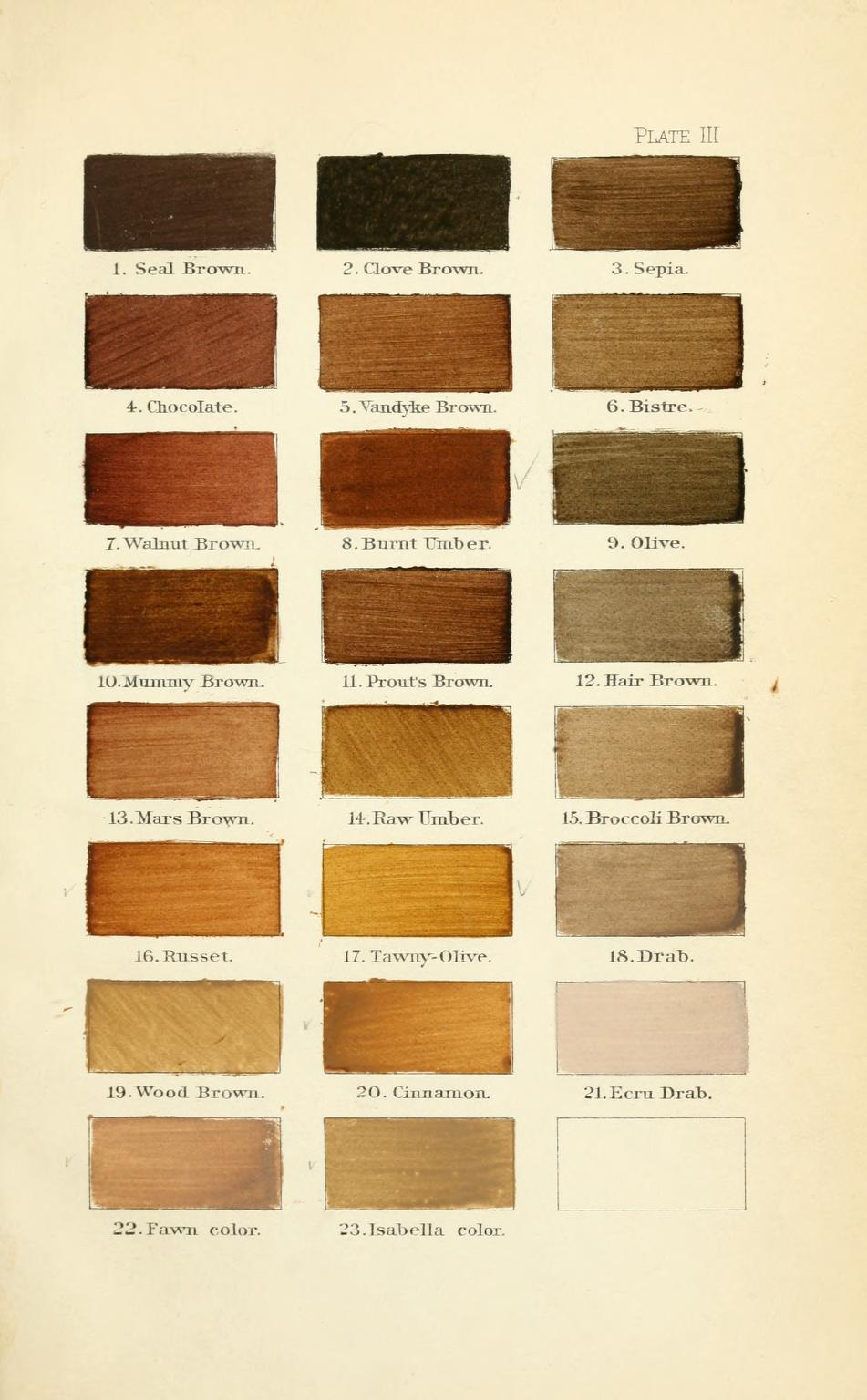
Mummy brown (located at number 10) along with other browns

Before "mummy brown" was used as a pigment, Egyptian mummies had a reputation for medicinal qualities. People used materials derived from mummies to treat a wide range of medical complaints, from toothaches to dysentery.

The exact start of the use of mummy brown is unclear. A 1594 document mentions it but it credits a document dating back to the 12th century. The pigment was made from the flesh of Egyptian mummies or Guanche mummies of the Canary Islands (both human and feline), mixed with white pitch and myrrh. The earliest record of the use of mummy brown dates back to 1712 when an artist supply shop called "À la momie" in Paris sold paints, varnish, and powdered mummy. In 1797, a Compendium of Colours published in London proclaimed that the finest brown used as a glaze by Benjamin West, the president of the Royal Academy, "is the flesh of mummy, the most fleshy are the best parts."

The pigment was popular from the mid-eighteenth to the nineteenth centuries. However, the demand for mummy brown sometimes exceeded the available supply of true Egyptian mummies, leading to occasional substitution of contemporary corpses of enslaved people or criminals. In aftermath of the French Revolution, the hearts of French kings were taken from the then Abbey of Saint-Denis, and used to make paint. By 1849, it was described as being "quite in vogue."

In 1881, the artist Edward Burne-Jones (a member of the so-called "Pre-Raphaelite Brotherhood") was reported to have ceremonially buried his tube of mummy brown in his garden when he discovered its true origins. According to Georgiana Burne-Jones, "Edward scouted the idea of the pigment having anything to do with a mummy − said the name must be only borrowed to describe a particular shade of brown," but after being assured by fellow painter Lawrence Alma-Tadema, who saw a mummy in his colourman workshop before it was ground up, Edward insisted on giving his only tube of mummy brown a "decent burial there and then."

Towards the end of the nineteenth century, mummy brown began to fall out of popularity. Fresh supplies of mummies diminished, and artists were less satisfied with the pigment's permanence and finish. By 1915, demand for mummy brown had slowed so much that one London colourman claimed he could satisfy his customers' requests for twenty years from a single Egyptian mummy. By the start of the 20th century, mummy brown had largely ceased production in its traditional form due to a continued decline in the supply of available mummies as well as a significant drop in demand.

In 1964, Time magazine reported that the sole distributor of the pigment, London colourmaker C. Roberson, had run out of mummies a few years prior. A tube of mummy brown pigment purchased from Roberson in early 1900s is on display at the Forbes Pigment Collection of the Harvard Art Museum.

== Visual characteristics ==
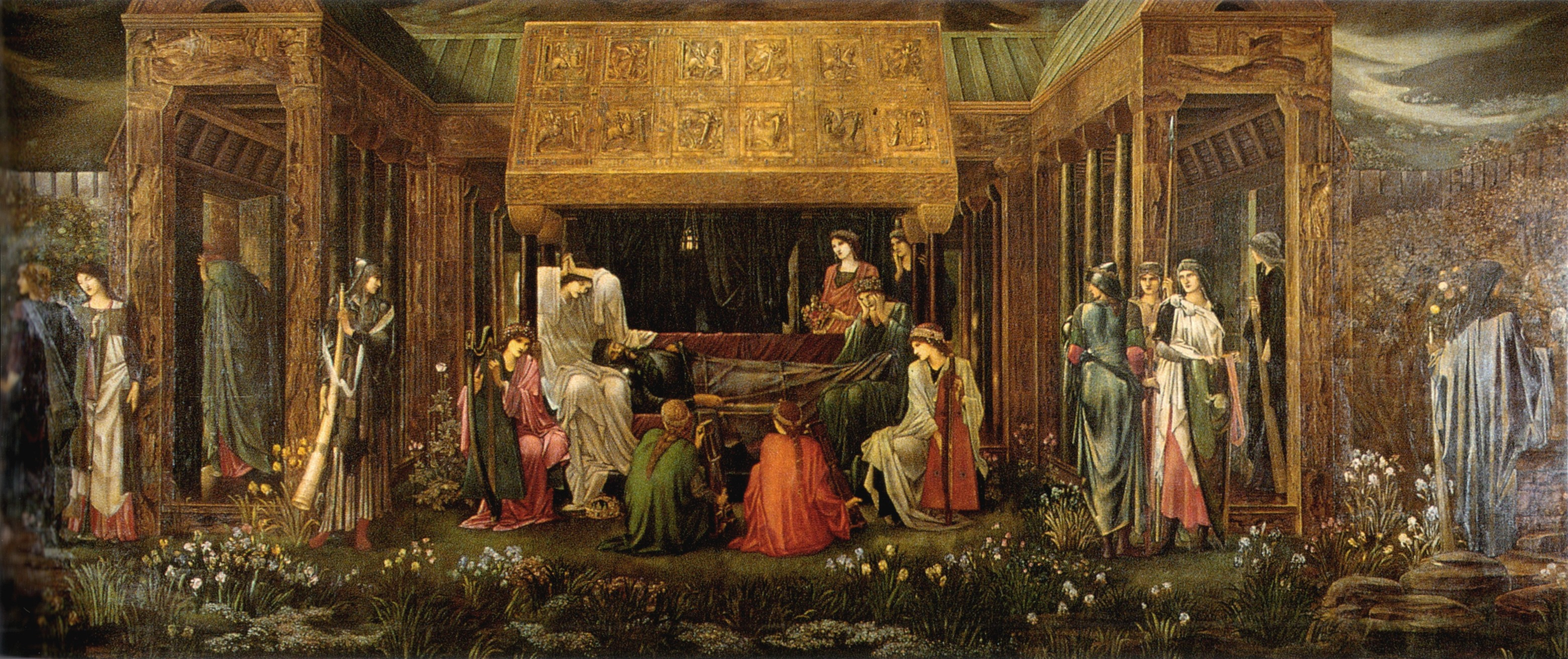
Edward Burne-Jones' Last Sleep of Arthur in Avalon was probably drawn using mummy brown

Ancient mummy brown is a rich brown pigment with a warm vibrancy. The colour is intermediate in tint between burnt umber and raw umber. It has good transparency. It could be used in oil paint and watercolour for glazing, shadows, flesh tones, and shading.

=== Modern alternative ===
The modern equivalent sold as "mummy brown" is composed of a mixture of kaolin, quartz, goethite, and haematite; with the haematite and goethite (generally 60% of the content) determining the colour. The more haematite, the redder the pigment, while the others are inert substances that can vary the opacity or tinting strength. The colour of mummy brown can vary from yellow to red to dark violet, the latter usually called "mummy violet".

== Permanence ==
Mummy brown exhibits poor permanence. According to Field, "little reliance" should be placed on this brown. It fades easily and cracks when used alone. However, when mixed with oil paints, it dries and the tendency to crack is diminished. It was also extremely variable in its composition and quality, and since it contained ammonia and particles of fat, it was likely to affect other colours it was used with.

== Notable occurrences ==
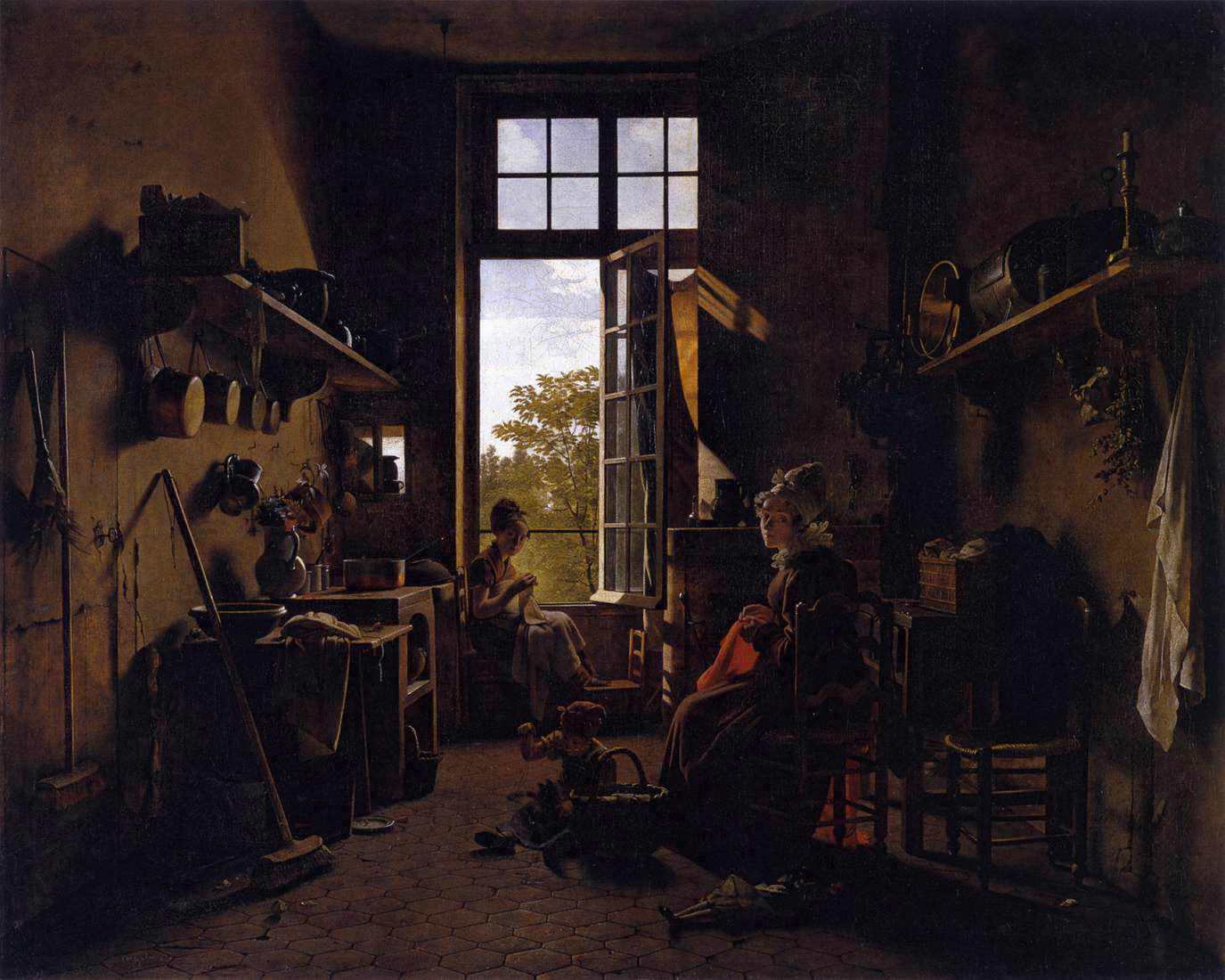
Martin Drolling's Interior of a Kitchen is believed to have been painted with an extensive use of mummy brown

Many artists, including Eugène Delacroix, William Beechey, Edward Burne-Jones, Lawrence Alma-Tadema, and Martin Drolling, are thought to have used mummy brown in their palettes. However, few works have been tested for its presence because the process is destructive.

Some popular paintings included in previous articles and research papers are thought to have been painted with mummy brown based on their visual characteristics. Examples include the Last Sleep of Arthur in Avalon by Edward Burne-Jones, Interior of a Kitchen by Martin Drolling, and Liberty Leading the People by Eugène Delacroix.

Eugène Delacroix' Liberty Leading the People is claimed to have been painted with mummy brown because Delacroix was "known to have used pigment made from ground mummy."

== See also ==
- Caput mortuum (pigment), a pigment also known as 'cardinal purple'
- Mummia, a medicinal preparation sometimes made from mummies
