= Alfred de Curzon =

French painter (1820–1895)

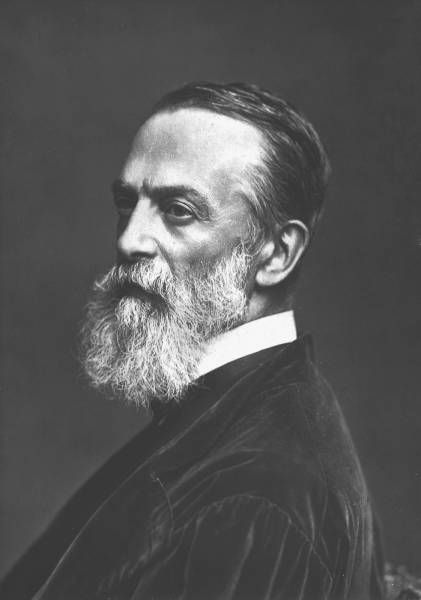
Alfred de Curzon (c.1885)

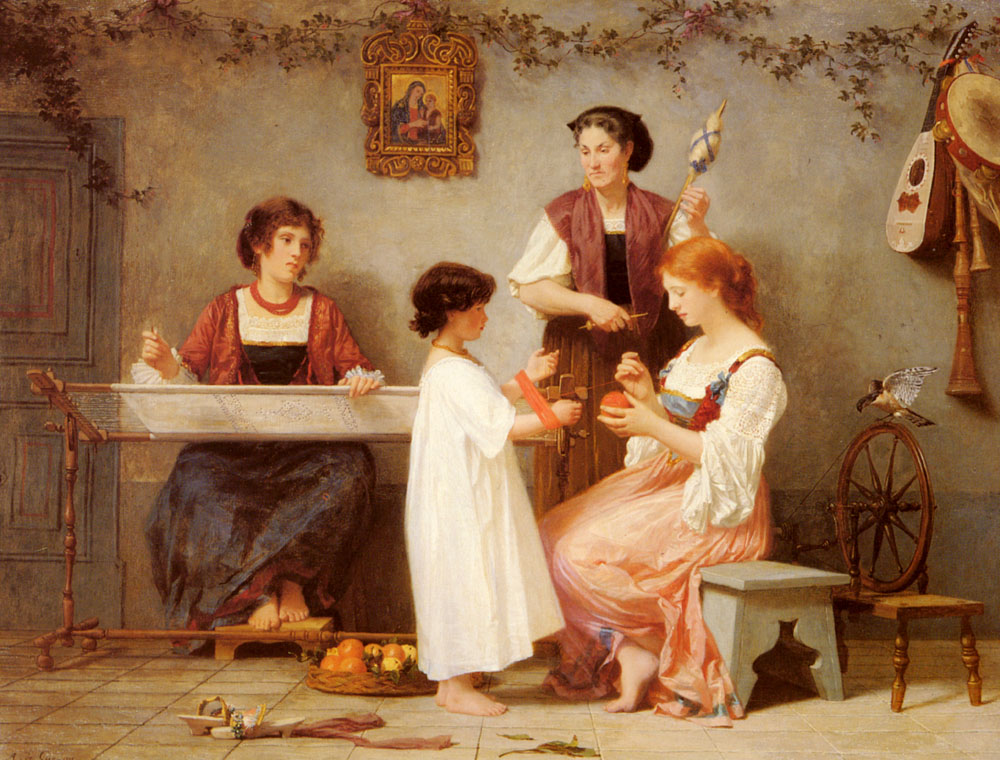
Afternoon Pastimes

Paul-Alfred Parent de Curzon (French: [alfʁɛd də kyʁzɔ̃]; 7 September 1820 – 4 July 1895) was a French painter, known for his genre scenes and landscapes with figures.

== Biography ==
He was born in Moulinet, Migné-Auxances, to an aristocratic family. His grandfather was General Joseph-Emmanuel-Auguste-François de Lambertye. His older brother, Emmanuel (1811–1896), was a noted sociologist. In 1838, Curzon attended the Salon and saw Médée furieuse by Eugène Delacroix. It made such an impression on him that he took up the study of pastels and decided to become a painter.

In 1840, Curzon enrolled at the École des beaux-arts de Paris and studied with Michel Martin Drolling. He had his début at the Salon in 1843. Upon the advice of one of his classmates, Louis Georges Brillouin, he switched to the landscape painting classes of Louis-Nicolas Cabat in 1845. Four years later, he produced his first major work, The Death of Milo of Croton. This enabled him to obtain a stipend for two years of study in Rome. There, he made the acquaintance of Alexandre Cabanel.

In 1852, he made an extensive tour of Greece, in the company of the writer, Edmond About, and the architect, Charles Garnier. Thereafter, Greek antiquities would play a major role in his work. In 1865, he was named a Chevalier in the Legion of Honor. He was awarded a first-class medal at the Exposition Universelle (1867).

Many of Curzon's works may be seen in the Musée Sainte-Croix in Poitiers. He died in Paris in 1895 and is buried in the Cimetière du Père-Lachaise

He was married to Amélie Saglio (1838–1889), the sister of Camille Saglio (1844–1904), an engineer and part-time painter. His son, Henri de Curzon, was a journalist and musicologist.
