= Weissenberger =

Weissenberger is a German surname. Notable people with the surname include:

- Markus Weissenberger (born 1975), Austrian footballer
- Theodor Weissenberger (1914–1950), German fighter ace
- Thomas Weissenberger (born 1971), Austrian footballer

== See also ==
- Weisenberger
- Berger
- Weissenberg (disambiguation)
- Weissenberge
- Weisenburger
