= Weissenberg effect =

Scientific phenomenon

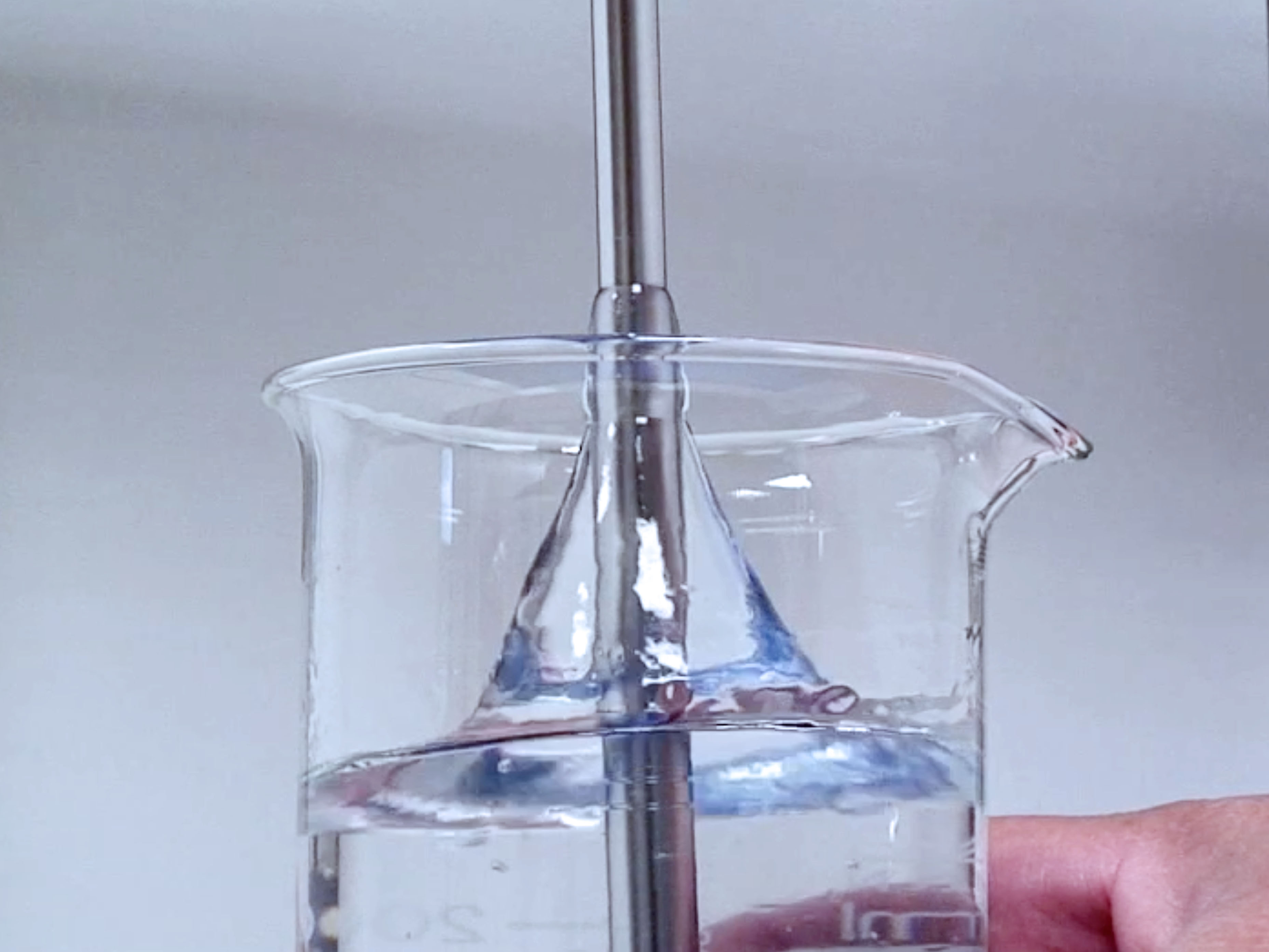
Illustration of the Weissenberg effect on a 2% solution of high molecular weight polyacrylamide

In fluid dynamics, the Weissenberg effect is a phenomenon that occurs when a spinning rod is inserted into a solution of elastic liquid. Instead of being thrown outward, the solution is drawn towards the rod and rises up around it. This is a direct consequence of the normal stress that acts like a hoop stress around the rod. The effect is a common example of non-Newtonian fluid dynamics, which has been shown to occur for polystyrene.

However, it is not always necessary to insert a rod to observe this effect. A rotating disk at the bottom of a viscoelastic non-Newtonian fluid can produce a similar phenomenon: the fluid rises at the center, whereas a Newtonian fluid forms a depression, as seen when stirred with a magnetic stirrer.

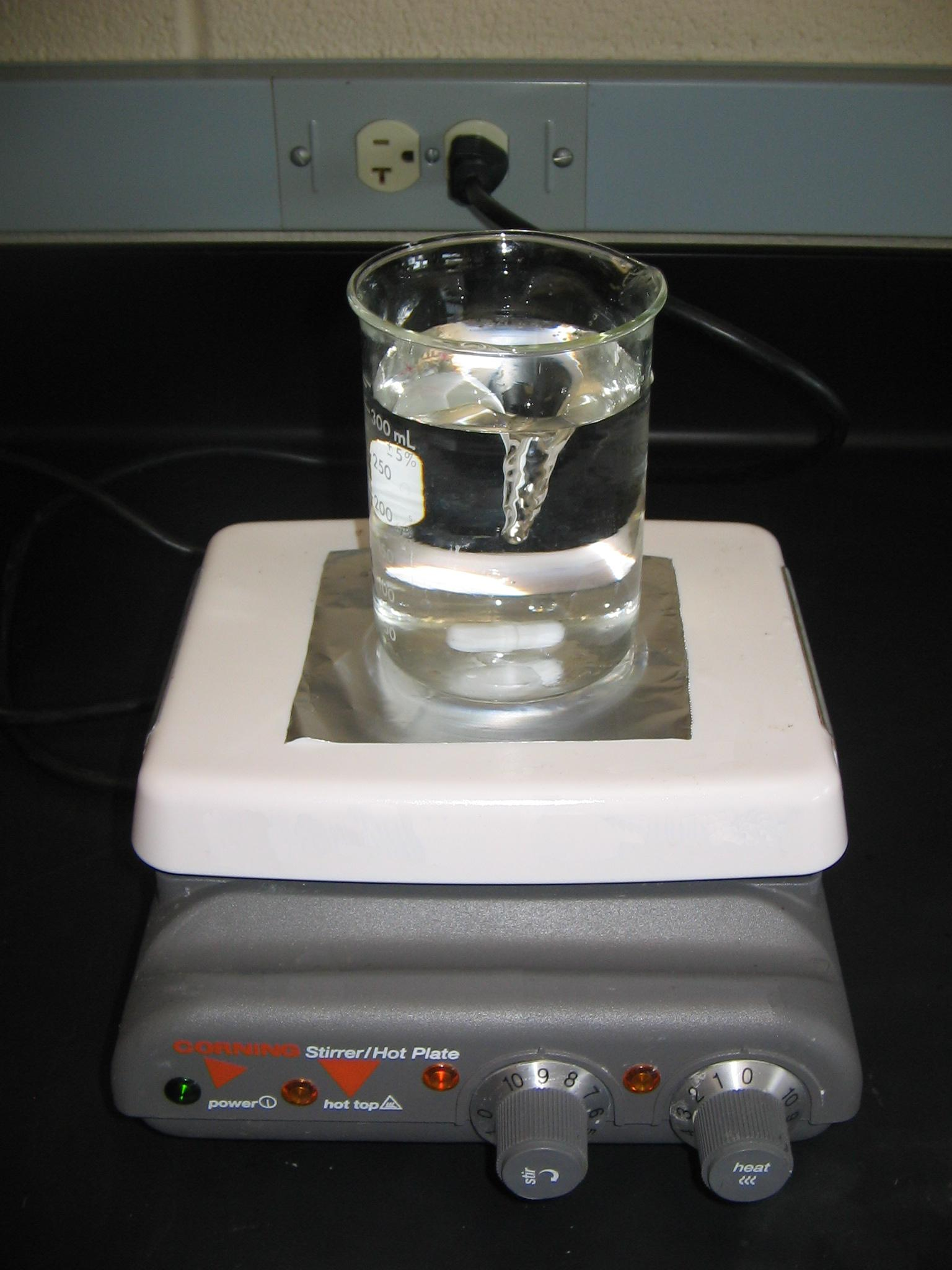
A Newtonian fluid forming a depression when stirred with a magnetic stirrer.

The height of the fluid at the center increases with both the rotational speed of the disk and the elasticity of the fluid.

The effect is named after Karl Weissenberg who published about it in 1947.
