= Martin Drolling =

French painter (1752–1817)

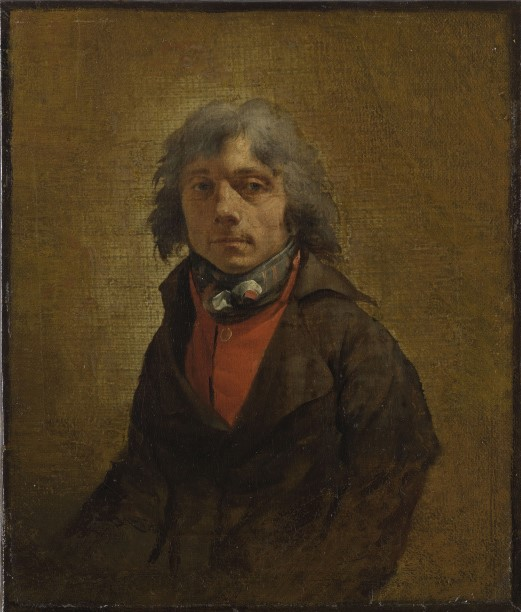
Portrait by Louis-Léopold Boilly, c. 1800

Martin Drolling, or Drolling the Elder (French: [maʁtɛ̃ dʁøliŋ]; Oberhergheim, 19 September 1752 – Paris, 16 April 1817), was a French painter. He was father to Michel Martin Drolling, and to Louise-Adéone Drölling, one of the few successful female painters of the time.

== Biography ==
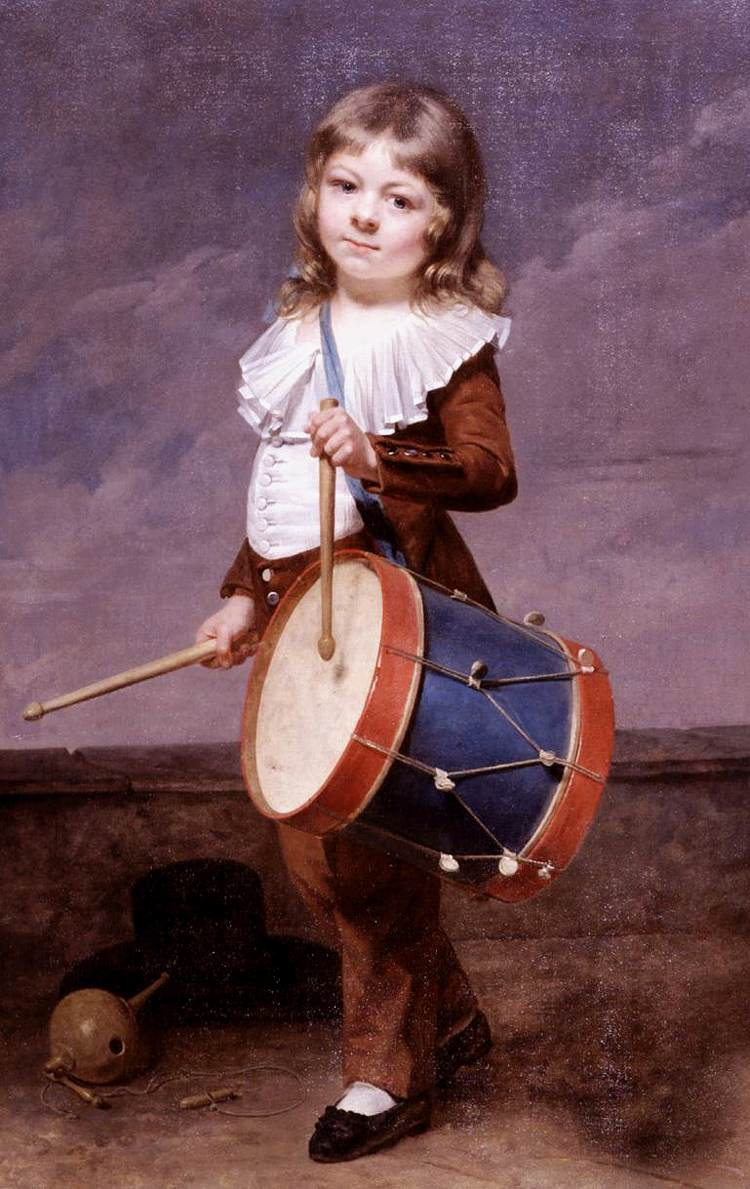
Portrait of his son Michel Martin Drolling as a drummer boy

Martin Drolling, a native of Oberhergheim, Haut-Rhin, near Colmar, was born in 1752. He received his first lessons in art from an obscure painter of Schlestadt, but afterwards went to Paris and entered the École des Beaux-Arts. He gained momentary celebrity from his Interior of a Kitchen, painted in 1815, exhibited at the Salon of 1817, and now in the Louvre. He usually painted interiors and familiar subjects of general interest. His works were popular during his lifetime, and many were engraved and lithographed. He died in Paris in 1817.

== Works ==
The Louvre has paintings of a Woman at a window and a Violin-Player by Drolling.

He made use of mummy brown possibly derived from the hearts of French kings.

== Gallery ==
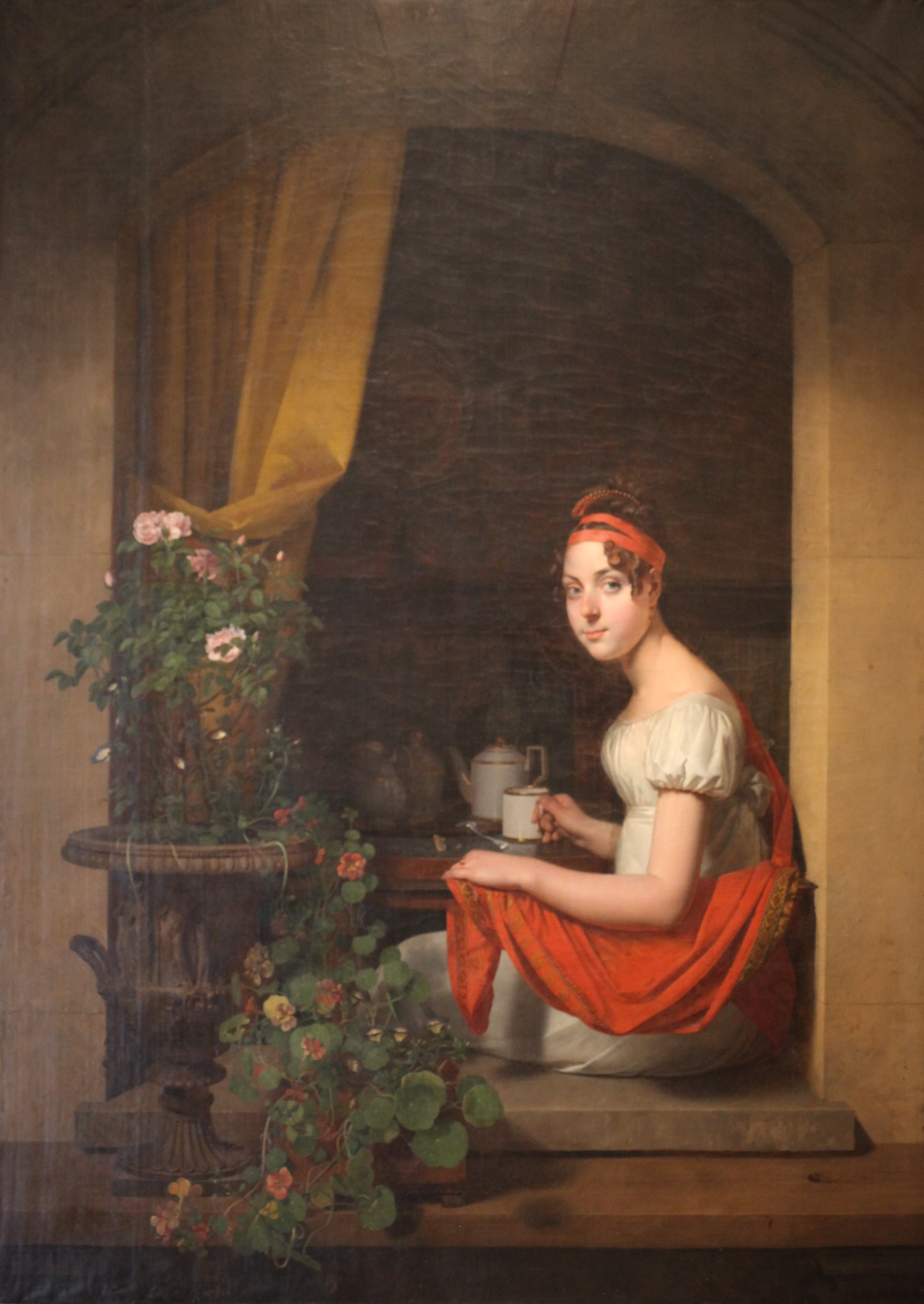
Portrait of Adéone

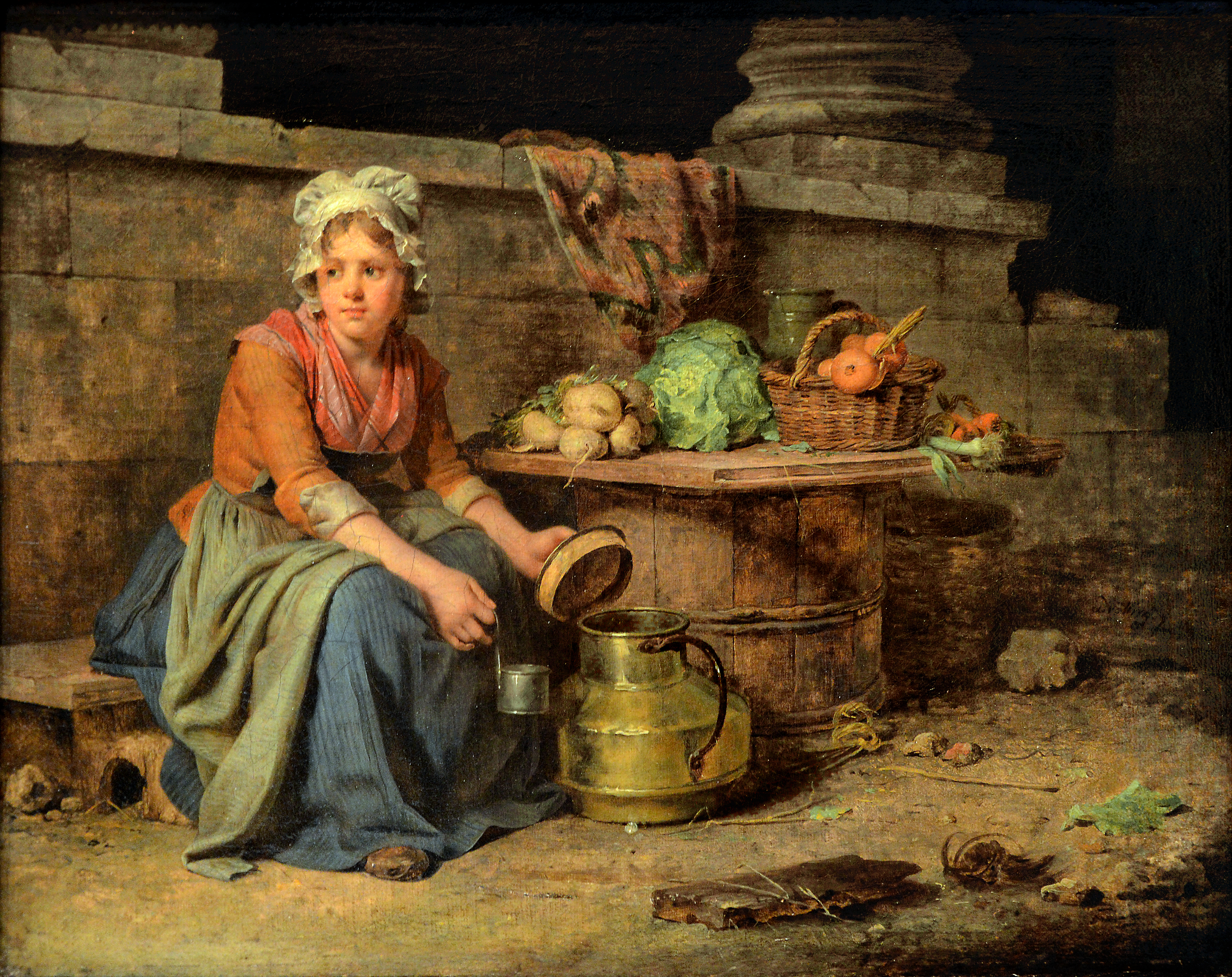
The little milk-girl

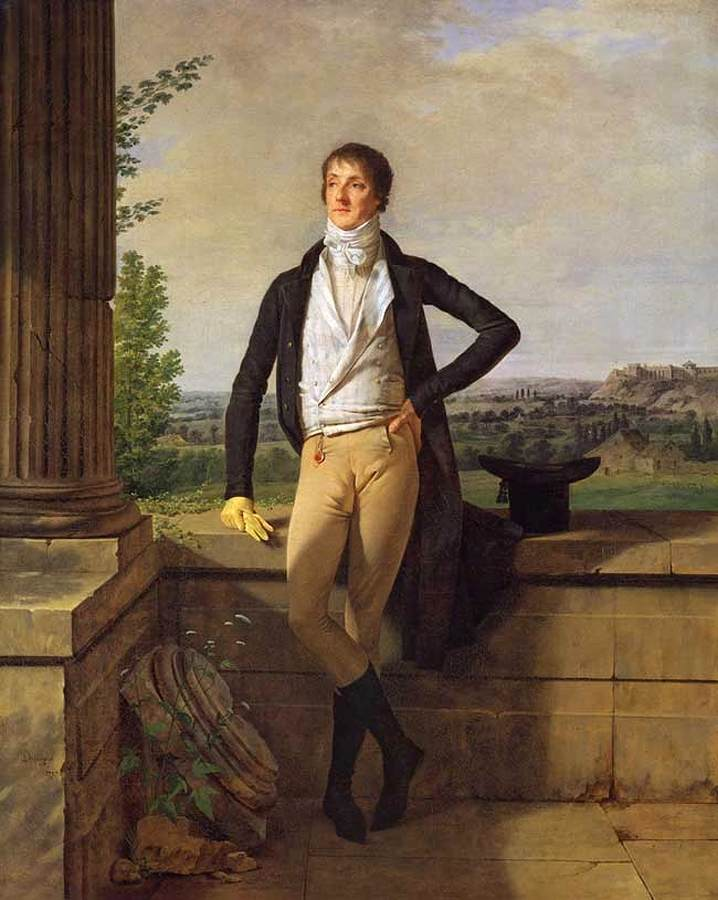
Barthélémy Charles, Comte de Dreux-Nancré

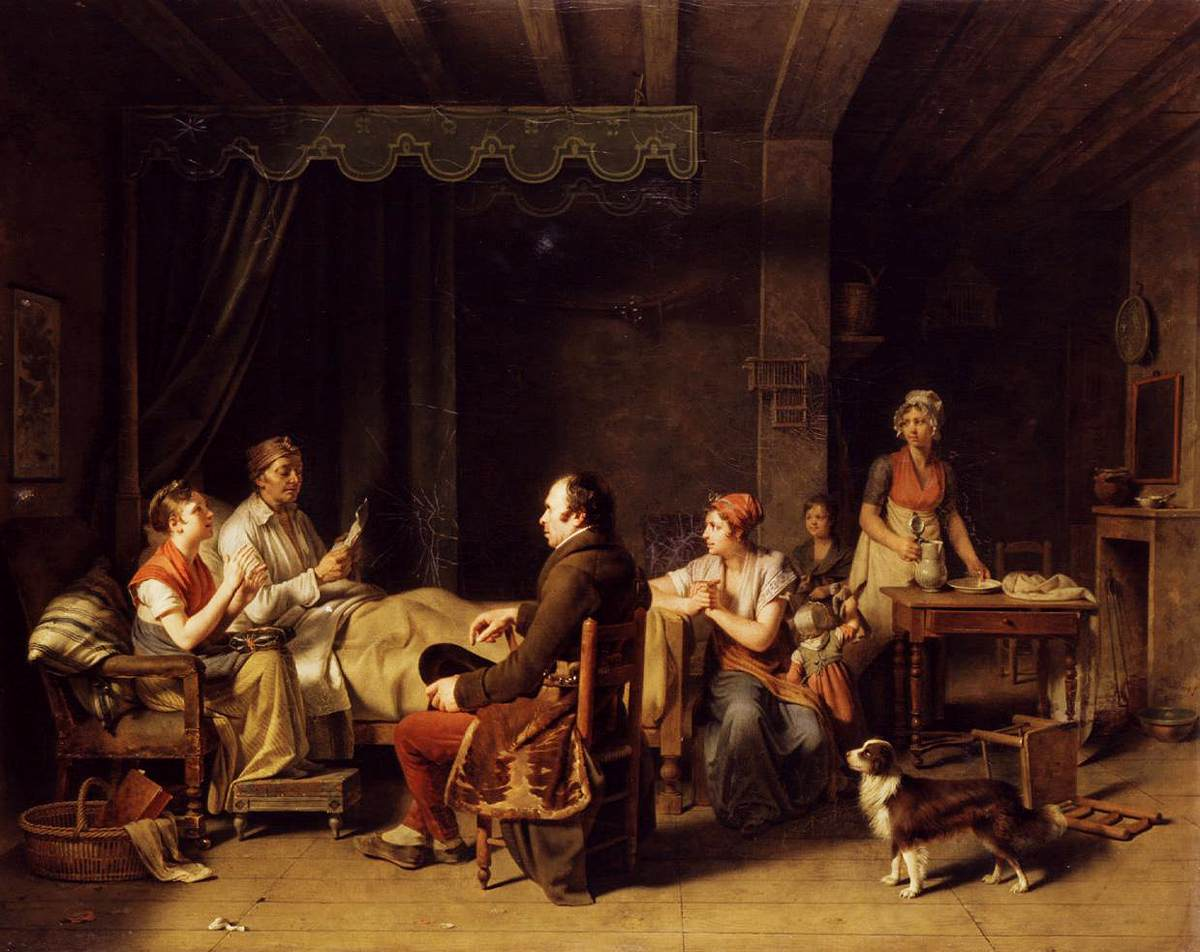
The messenger or "The Good News", 1806

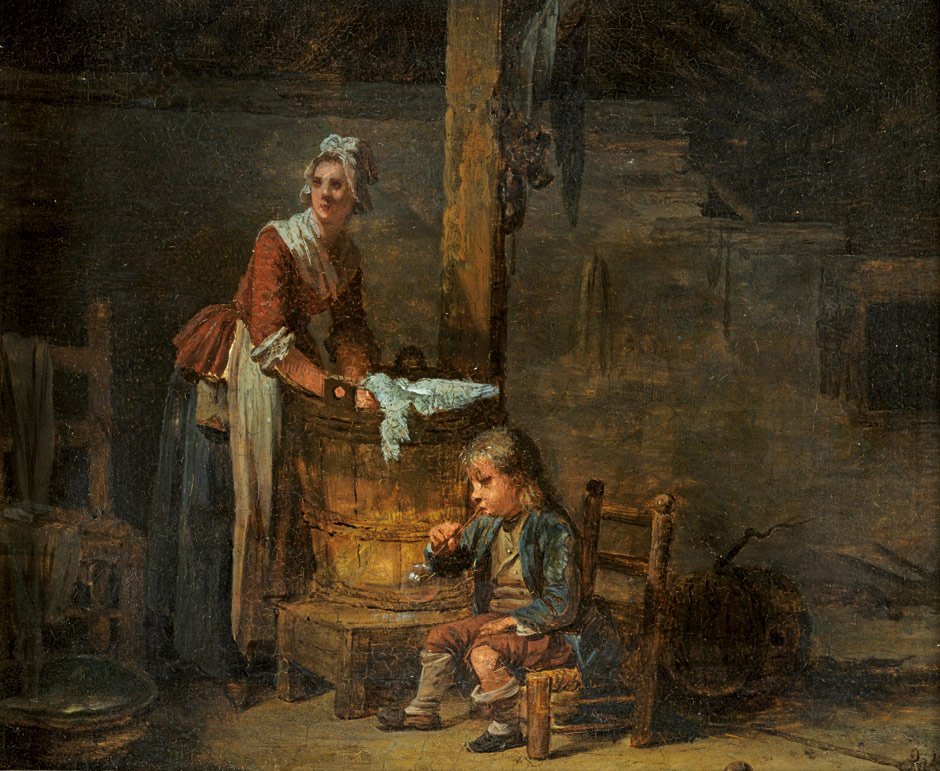
Laundry

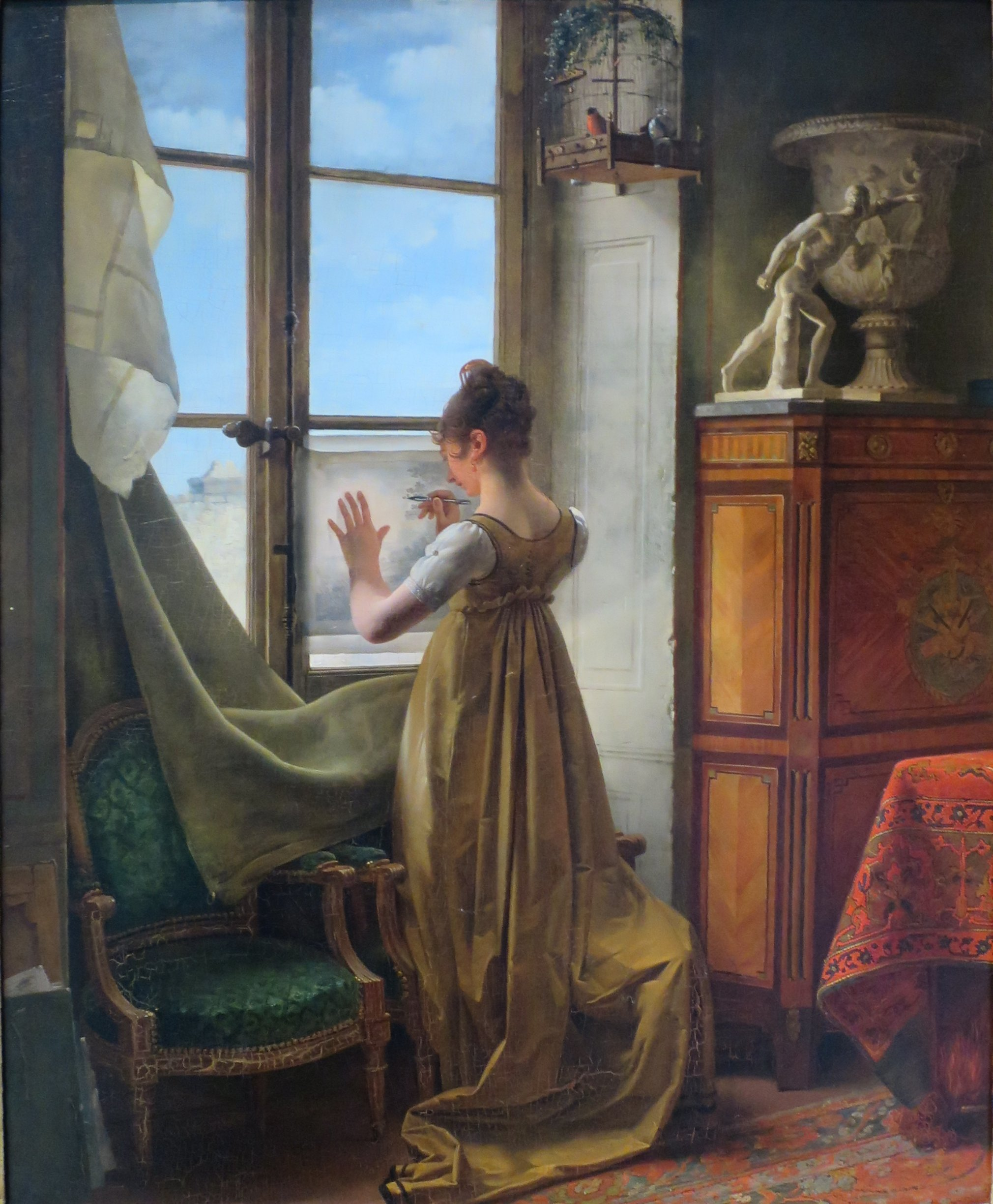
A Girl Copying a Drawing
Pushkin Museum, Moscow

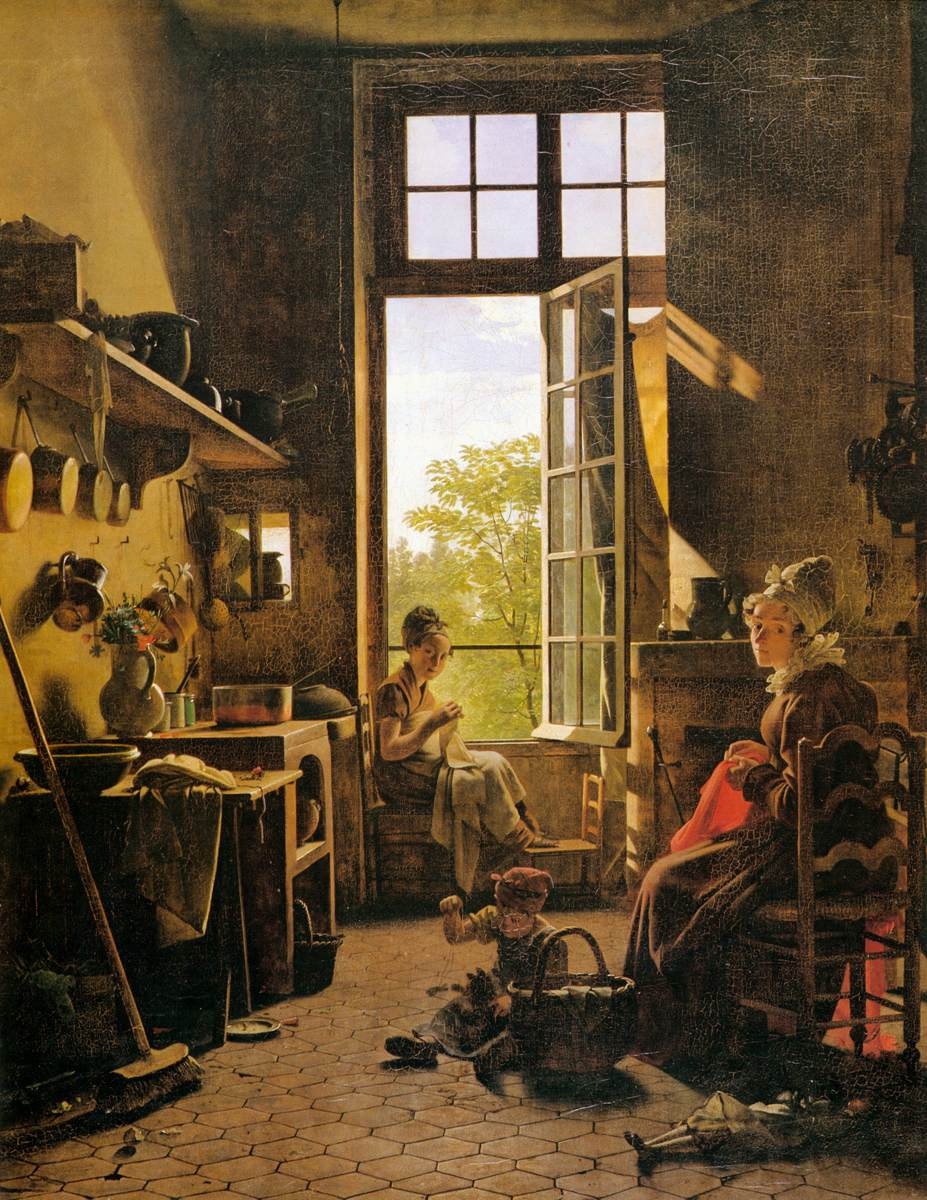
Interior of a kitchen (detail), Louvre, 1815
