= Karl Weissenberg =

Austrian mathematician and physicist

- Born: Karl Weissenberg; 11 July 1893; Vienna, Austria-Hungary
- Died: 6 April 1976 (aged 82); The Hague, Netherlands
- Education: University of Berlin; University of Jena; University of Vienna
- Known for: Weissenberg effect Weissenberg number Weissenberg rheogoniometer Weissenberg–Rabinowitsch–Mooney correction factor
- Awards: Duddell Medal (1946)

Karl Weissenberg (11 June 1893, Vienna – 6 April 1976, The Hague) was an Austrian physicist, notable for his contributions to rheology and crystallography.

== Biography ==
The Weissenberg effect was named after him, as was the Weissenberg number. He invented a Goniometer to study X-ray diffraction of crystals for which he received the Duddell Medal of the Institute of Physics in 1946, The European Society of Rheology offers a Weissenberg award in his honour. and the Weissenberg rheogoniometer, a type of rheometer.

He was born on 11 June 1893 in Vienna, Austria and died in 1976 in the Netherlands. He studied at the Universities of Vienna, Berlin and Jena with Mathematics as his main subject. He published on the theories of Symmetry groups and Tensor and Matrix algebra, then applied mathematics and experimentation to crystallography, rheology and medical science.
