= Weissenberg number =

Dimensionless parameter in fluid mechanics

The Weissenberg number (Wi) is a dimensionless number used in the study of viscoelastic flows. It is named after Karl Weissenberg. The dimensionless number compares the elastic forces to the viscous forces. It can be variously defined, but it is usually given by the relation of stress relaxation time of the fluid and a specific process time. For instance, in simple steady shear, the Weissenberg number, often abbreviated as Wi or We, is defined as the shear rate $\dot{\gamma}$ times the relaxation time $\lambda$. Using the Maxwell model and the Oldroyd-B model, the elastic forces can be written as the first Normal force (N_{1}).

$\text{Wi} = \dfrac{ \mbox{elastic forces} }{ \mbox{viscous forces} } = \frac{\tau_{xx}-\tau_{yy}}{\tau_{xy}} = \frac{2\lambda\mu\dot{\gamma}^2}{\mu\dot{\gamma}}= 2 \dot{\gamma} \lambda.\,$

Since this number is obtained from scaling the evolution of the stress, it contains choices for the shear or elongation rate, and the length-scale. Therefore the exact definition of all non dimensional numbers should be given as well as the number itself.

While Wi is similar to the Deborah number and is often confused with it in technical literature, they have different physical interpretations. The Weissenberg number indicates the degree of anisotropy or orientation generated by the deformation, and is appropriate to describe flows with a constant stretch history, such as simple shear. In contrast, the Deborah number should be used to describe flows with a non-constant stretch history, and physically represents the rate at which elastic energy is stored or released.

Pipkin diagram shows different flow regimes of a material regarding to Deborah number and Weissenberg number.
