= Weissenburg =

The German names Weissenburg and Weißenburg can refer to:

- Weißenburg in Bayern is a town in Germany
- Weißenburg-Gunzenhausen is a Landkreis (district) in the west of Germany
- Weißenburg, Lower Austria
- Alba Iulia in Romania
- Wissembourg in France (earlier known as Weißenburg)
  - Weissenburg Abbey, Alsace, former Benedictine abbey at Wissembourg
- Weissenburg Castle, a ruined castle in the municipality of Därstetten of the Canton of Bern in Switzerland
- Weissenburg im Simmental, a resort in the Niedersimmental, above Lake Thun, Switzerland
- Weissenburgbad (formerly Kuranstalt Weissenburg), a former spa in Därstetten, Canton Bern, Switzerland
- Weissenburg, Ontario in Waterloo County, Ontario, Canada
