= Michel Martin Drolling =

French neoclassic painter (1786–1851)

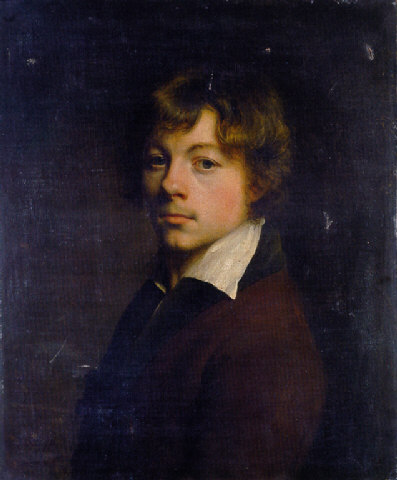
- Self-portrait (1804)
- Born: 7 March 1786; Paris, France
- Died: 9 January 1851 (aged 64); Paris, France
- Occupation: Painter
- Father: Martin Drolling
- Relatives: Louise-Adéone Drölling (sister)

Michel Martin Drolling (French: [miʃɛl maʁtɛ̃ dʁøliŋ]; 7 March 1786 – 9 January 1851) was a neoclassic French painter noted especially as a painter of history and portraitist.

== Biography ==
He was born in Paris. There, he began painting under the supervision of his father, the painter Martin Drolling. After 1806, he studied with Jacques-Louis David. He won the Prix de Rome in 1810 for The Wrath of Achilles. After having worked at the French Academy in Rome, he became known for the Death of Abel, exhibited at the Salon of 1817.

Consequently, he received many orders and produced, notably, The Lord Descends to Earth to Establish his Empire and Spread his Good Deeds for the ceiling of the room of Illustrious Men at the Louvre, The States-General of Tours in 1836 and The Convention of Alexandria in 1837, both for the museum of history in the Palace of Versailles and Jesus Among the Doctors for the Church of Our-Lady-of-Loretto in Paris in 1840. He was elected a member of the Académie des Beaux-Arts in 1837 and was later named a Professor at the École Nationale Supérieure des Beaux-Arts. He died in Paris in 1851.

His paintings of history follow the spirit of the time: theatricality combined with bright colours, contrast of lights and precision of detail.

His most important pupils include Paul Baudry, Victor Biennourry, Jules Breton, Theodor Aman, Roger Fenton, Alfred de Curzon, Charles Joshua Chaplin, Pierre-Victor Galland, Jean-Jacques Henner, Cornelius Krieghoff, Armand Laroche, Alphonse Muraton, Charles Nègre, John Charles Robinson, Jules-Émile Saintin, Théophile Schuler and William Strutt.

== Gallery ==
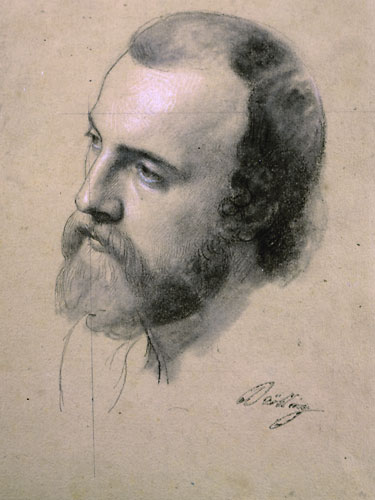
Head of Christ (study)

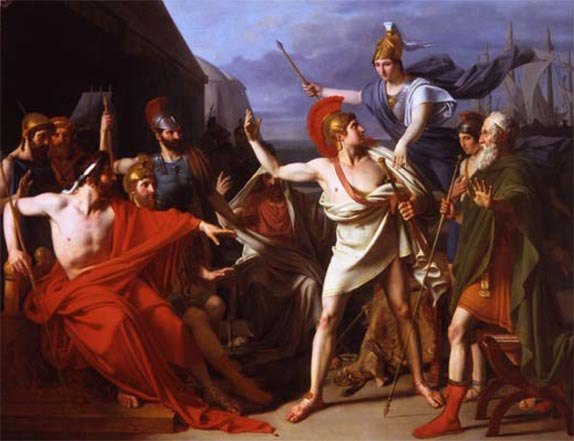
The Wrath of Achilles (1810)

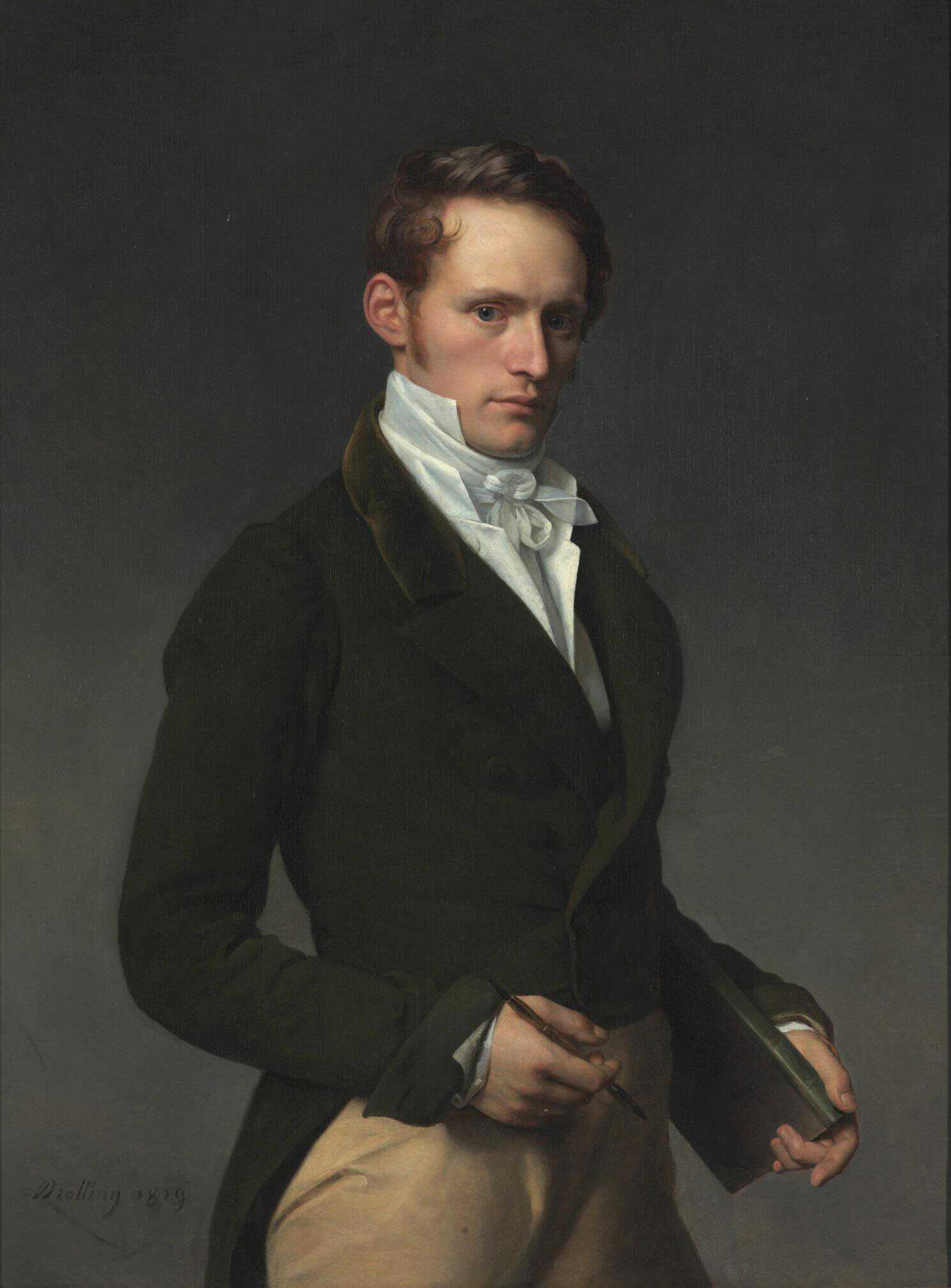
Portrait of the artist (1819)

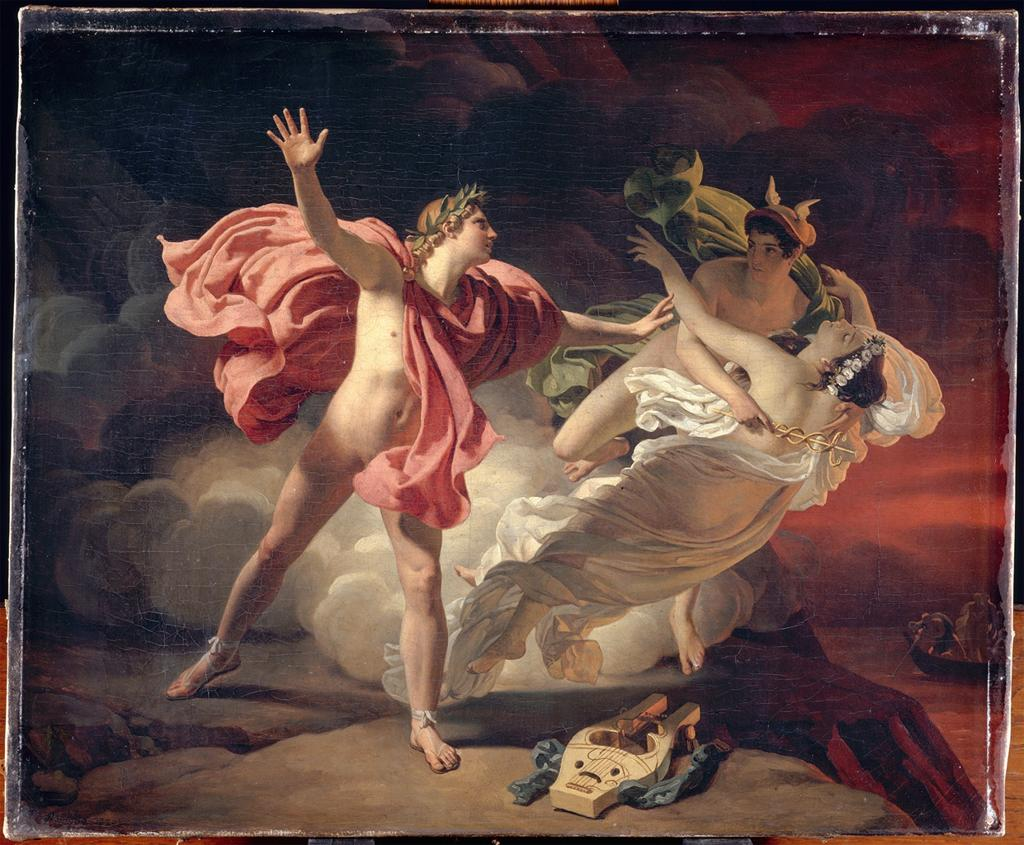
Orpheus and Eurydice (1820)

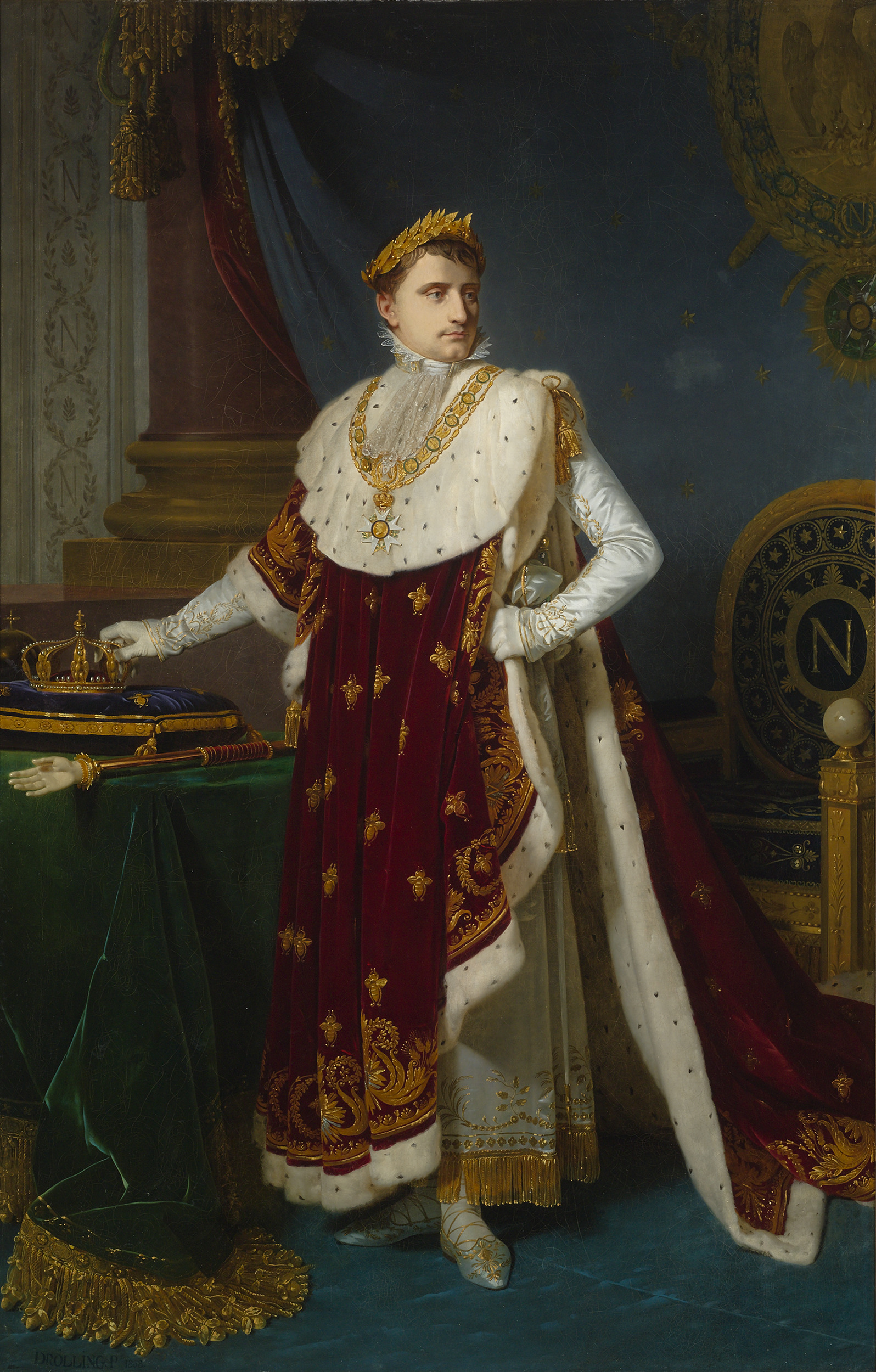
Official Portrait of Emperor Napoleon I (1808)

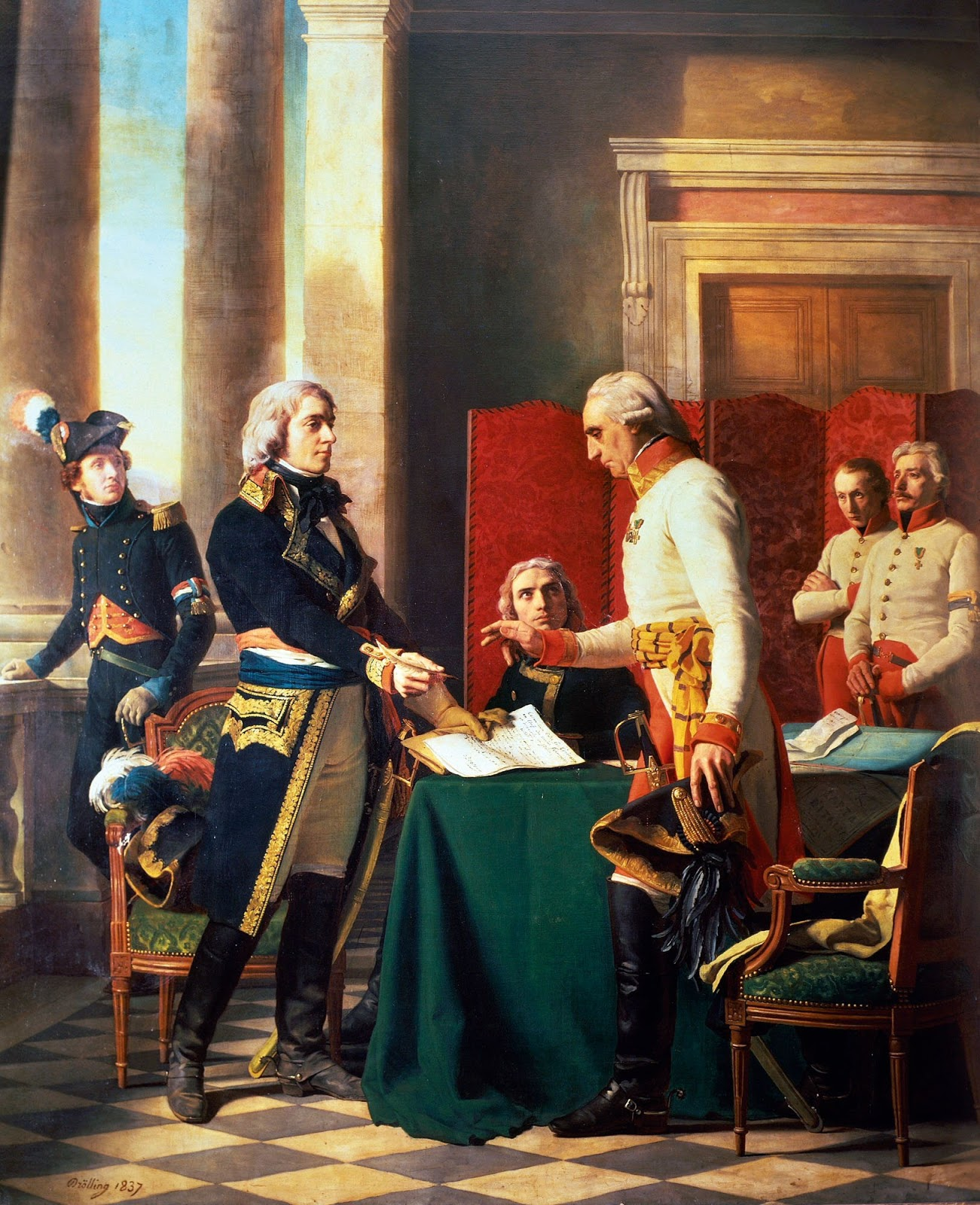
Signing of the Convention of Alexandria

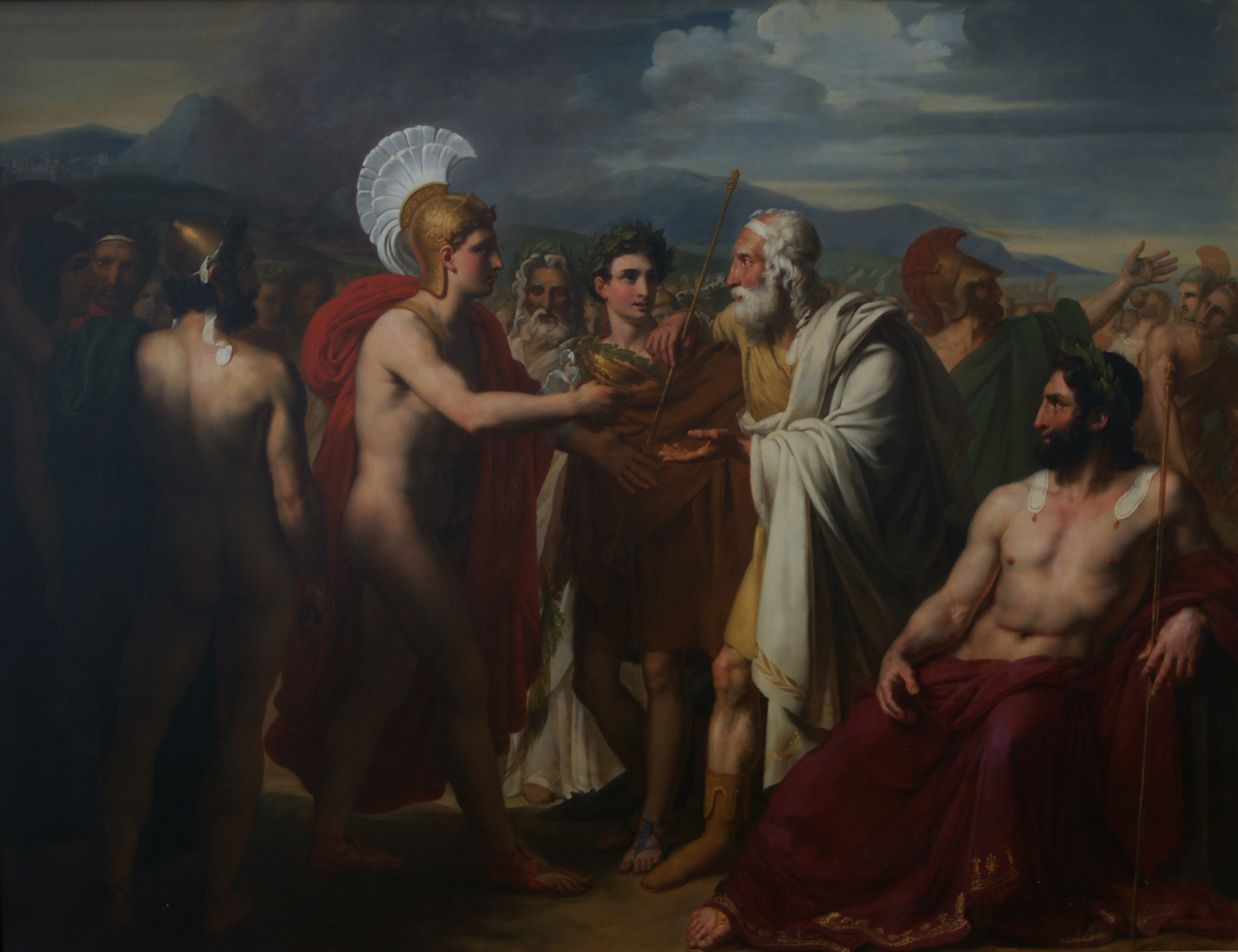
Agamemnon watching as Achilles presents the prize of wisdom to Nestor during the funeral games, Mougins Museum of Classical Art

Portrait of a Child, 1818, Louvre Museum
