= Jack Weisenburger =

American football and baseball player (1926–2019)

- Weisenburger from 1944 Muskegon Heights H.S. yearbook

Biographical details
- Born: August 2, 1926; Muskegon County, Michigan, U.S.
- Died: March 25, 2019 (aged 92); Mt. Pleasant, Michigan, U.S.

Playing career
- 1944–1947: Michigan
- Positions: Halfback, Fullback, Quarterback

Accomplishments and honors

Awards
- Second-team All-Big Nine (1947)

John Edward Weisenburger (August 2, 1926 – March 25, 2019) was an American football and baseball player. He played college football for the University of Michigan from 1944 to 1947 and was the starting fullback for the undefeated 1947 Michigan Wolverines football team that became known as the "Mad Magicians" and has been rated as the greatest football team in Michigan history. He later played professional baseball for five years from 1948 to 1952.

== Early life ==
Weisenburger was born in Muskegon County, Michigan, in August 1926. His father, Merle Weisenburger, was an Ohio native who worked as a laborer in a pattern shop. His mother, Ada Weisenburger, was a Michigan native. At the time of the 1930 United States census, Weisenburger lived in Norton Shores, Michigan, with his parents and two brothers, Robert (born c. 1923) and Kenneth (born c. 1929). He attended Muskegon Heights High School where he played varsity football (three years), basketball (two years), baseball (four years), and track (one year). He was an all-conference basketball player and was selected as the class president in his sophomore, junior and senior years. The 1944 Muskegon Heights High School yearbook said of him, "Ferocious in football, and a good fellow always."

== College career ==
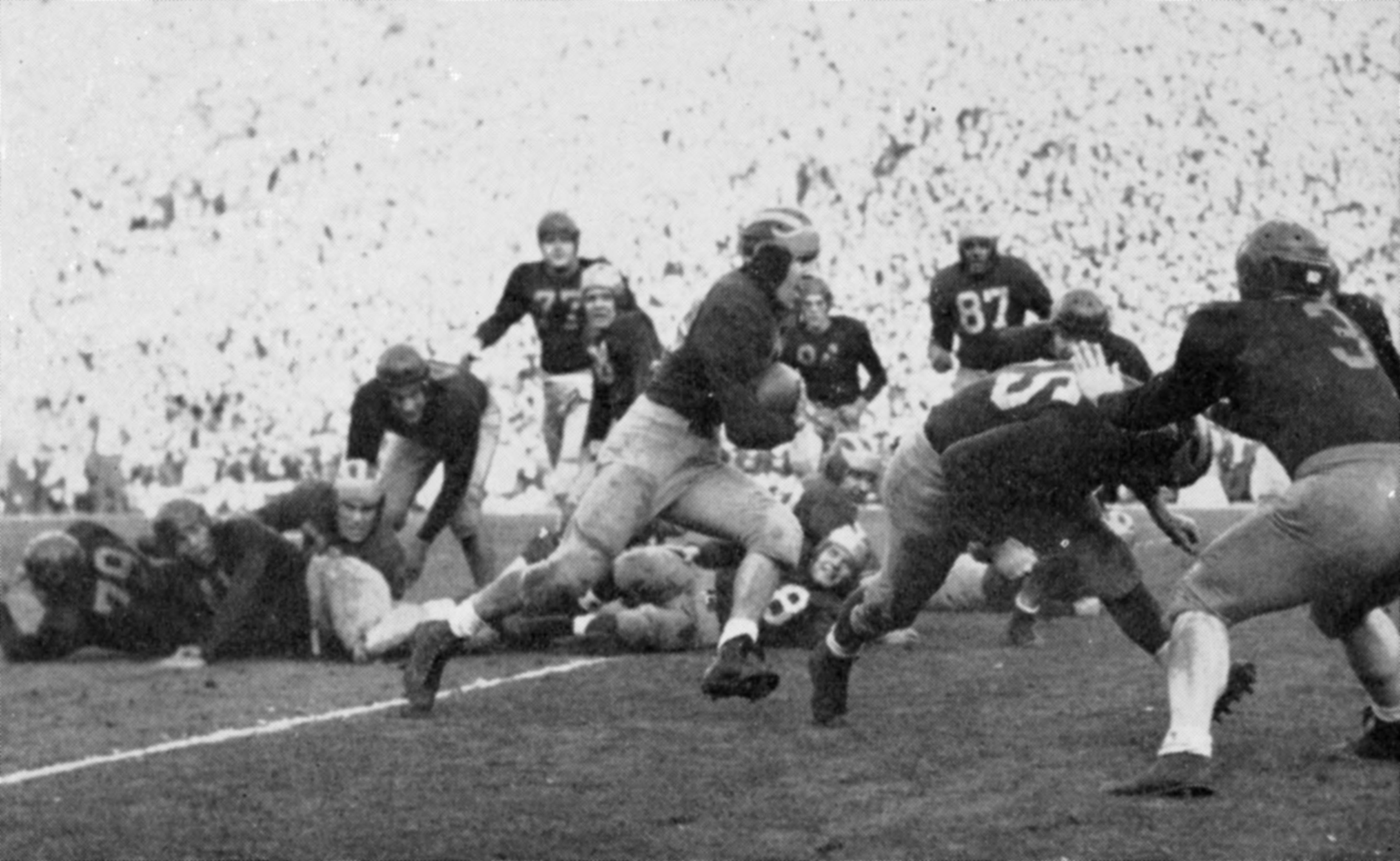
Weisenburger scoring his 3rd touchdown during the 1948 Rose Bowl

Weisenburger played college football as a halfback, fullback and quarterback at the University of Michigan from 1944 to 1947. He started five games at fullback for the 1944 Michigan Wolverines football team, and played five games at fullback and one at halfback for the 1945 team. In 1946, he started the season as a fullback, but suffered a broken jaw in an early game against Army. Weisenburger ended up starting three games at quarterback and one each at fullback and halfback for the 1946 team. As a senior, Weisenbuger was the starting fullback for the 1947 Michigan Wolverines football team that finished the season with a 10–0 record and outscored opponents 394 to 53. The 1947 team became known as the "Mad Magicians" and is considered by some to be the greatest Michigan team of all time. One sports writer referred to the 1947 backfield (Weisenbuger, Bob Chappuis and Bump Elliott) as "a backfield full of pervasive shadows that flit about like wraiths." The 1947 Michigan team is also notable for head coach Fritz Crisler's innovation of modern platoon football; Weisenburger was one of two Michigan players in 1947 (the other was Bump Elliott) who played both offense and defense. He finished his football career by scoring three touchdowns in the 1948 Rose Bowl against the USC Trojans. He scored the game's first touchdown ten minutes into the game and added two more later in the game. He later recalled, "What astonished me was the ease with which our line opened holes for us. It was one of those days when everything clicked." Michigan won the game 49 to 0.

Weisenburger also played as an infielder for the Michigan Wolverines baseball team from 1945 to 1948. Weisenburger's contributions to the baseball team were described as follows:

"One of Michigan's outstanding all-around athletes, Jack Weisenburger, the spinning fullback of the Rose Bowl eleven, was equally at home on the Wolverine diamond. In his four year baseball career at Michigan, Weisenburger alternated between shortstop and the outfield. He led the Maize and Blue batting parade last season and will captain the squad during the 1948 campaign."

Weisenburger was a member of the Phi Delta Theta fraternity at Michigan. He graduated from Michigan in 1948 with a degree in physical education.

== Professional baseball ==
Weisenburger was drafted by the Washington Redskins of the National Football League and the New York Yankees of the All-America Football Conference, but he opted instead to play professional baseball. He played professional baseball from 1948 to 1952 for the Pawtucket Slaters (1948), Milwaukee Brewers (1949–1951), Denver Bears (1949), Evansville Braves (1951) and Tulsa Oilers (1952). During his career, he played mostly as a third baseman, but also as an outfielder, second baseman and shortstop. He had his best season in 1950, when he played in 121 games for the Brewers and compiled a .404 slugging average with 20 doubles, 13 home runs, and 43 RBIs.

== Later life ==
After retiring from baseball, Weisenburger had a successful career in the insurance business at Mt. Pleasant, Michigan. From 1948 to 1960, Weisenburger was also a registered official for high school athletics. During that time, he officiated at almost 150 high school football games and almost 600 basketball games.

Weisenburger was inducted into the Muskegon Area Sports Hall of Fame in 1991.

Weisenburger was inducted into the University of Michigan Hall of Honor in 1992. He died on March 25, 2019, at the age of 92 in Mount Pleasant.
