= Pictet Collection =

Private art collection

- Established: 2004
- Location: Geneva, Switzerland
- Website: collection.pictet

The Pictet Collection is a private art collection established by the Pictet financial group since 2004. It is composed of paintings, photographs, drawings, sculptures, installations and videos made by artists born in or having a strong cultural link with Switzerland. In 2021, the collection had over 900 works of art.

Loa Haagen Pictet has been the curator of the Collection since 2015. She was also president of the International Association of Corporate Collections of Contemporary Art (IACCCA) from 2014 to 2022.

== History ==
Before the creation of its collection, the Pictet Group had a limited number of works of art in its offices, mainly dating from the nineteenth century. In 2004, the group began building up a full-fledged art collection, the initial aim of which was to decorate its new headquarters in the Acacias district in Geneva. The idea was to assemble a collection of works of art dating from the founding of the Pictet bank (1805) to the present day, visible on a daily basis to the bank's employees and clients.

The Pictet Collection is on display at the Group's headquarters in Geneva, as well as in its offices in Switzerland and abroad, including Lausanne, Zürich, London, Milan, Barcelona, Paris, Montreal, Hong Kong, and Singapore. In 2018, the Collection also became available to the general public in digital form by being freely searchable on the collection's website. This digital referencing also simplifies the identification of works for cultural institutions wishing to make a loan request. The pieces are regularly loaned to museums in Switzerland and abroad. The Hermitage Foundation in Lausanne devoted an exhibition to Hans Emmenegger in 2021, borrowing his works from the Collection.

The Collection is growing at a steady pace, and in a variety of fields: paintings, photographs, drawings, sculptures, but also in situ installations, architectural creations and video works. An important part of the Collection is dedicated to contemporary art. The first works acquired by the Pictet Group in 2004 were paintings from the twentieth century by Cuno Amiet. The collection had 600 works in 2016, 650 in 2017, 780 in 2018, 850 in 2020 and over 900 in 2021, two-thirds of which are the work of contemporary artists.

== Artists ==
Among the artists whose works are on display in the collection are:

- Jacques-Laurent Agasse
- Cuno Amiet
- John M. Armleder
- Jean Arp
- Alice Bailly
- Max Bill
- Miriam Cahn
- Alexandre Calame
- François Diday
- Hans Emmenegger
- Peter Fischli & David Weiss
- Sylvie Fleury
- Franz Gertsch
- Alberto Giacometti
- Giovanni Giacometti
- Thomas Hirschhorn
- Ferdinand Hodler
- Christian Marclay
- Olivier Mosset
- Meret Oppenheim
- Markus Raetz
- Pierre-Louis De la Rive
- Ugo Rondinone
- Niki de Saint Phalle
- Roman Signer
- Louis Soutter
- Daniel Spoerri
- Beat Streuli
- Jean Tinguely
- Niele Toroni
- Félix Valloton
- Rémy Zaugg

== Awards ==
In 2017, Global Corporate Collections ranked the Pictet Collection as one of the "100 best private corporate collections in the world".

== See also ==
- Prix Pictet
