= Abraham-Louis-Rodolphe Ducros =

Swiss painter, watercolourist and engraver (1748–1810)

Louis Ducros (Moudon, 21 July 1748 – Lausanne, 18 February 1810), also known as Abraham-Louis-Rodolphe Ducros or Du Cros, as appears on his birth certificate, was a Swiss painter, water-colourist and engraver, and was a main figure in the 'pre-Romantic' movement.

== Biography ==
=== Early life ===
Abraham-Louis-Rodolphe was one of three sons of Jeanne-Marie Bissat and Jean-Rodolphe Du Cros, a writing and drawing master ("maître d'écriture et de dessin") at Moudon and later Yverdon College. He was born in Moudon (canton of Vaud) and not in Yverdon, as often repeated in error in several sources from the earliest days on, an error, no doubt, attributable to the fact that Du Cros, who grew up in Yverdon as a boy, thus considering himself to be "from Yverdon", attached "d'Yverdun" as a kind of epitheton ornans to his name, as did his friends, and biographers... He was educated at the college of Lausanne, where his parents destined him to go into commerce, to no avail. Du Cros preferred to go to Geneva in 1769, to study for two years in a private academy under Chevalier Nicolas-Henri-Joseph de Fassin, a painter from Liège formed in the Flemish tradition. It is probable that he left for a voyage to Flanders with his master, in 1771, after which he returned to Geneva, where he came into contact with the banker-collector François Tronchin and the naturalist Charles Bonnet. Ducros became friends with the Genevois painter Pierre-Louis De la Rive, with whom, between 1773 and 1776, he copied Dutch and Flemish paintings (by van Ruisdael, Philips Wouwermans, Nicolas Berghem and more) from the Tronchin collection and realised watercolours in the Geneva countryside. Sketching and painting en plein air, he became fascinated by the analysis and recording of natural phenomena.

=== Italian period ===
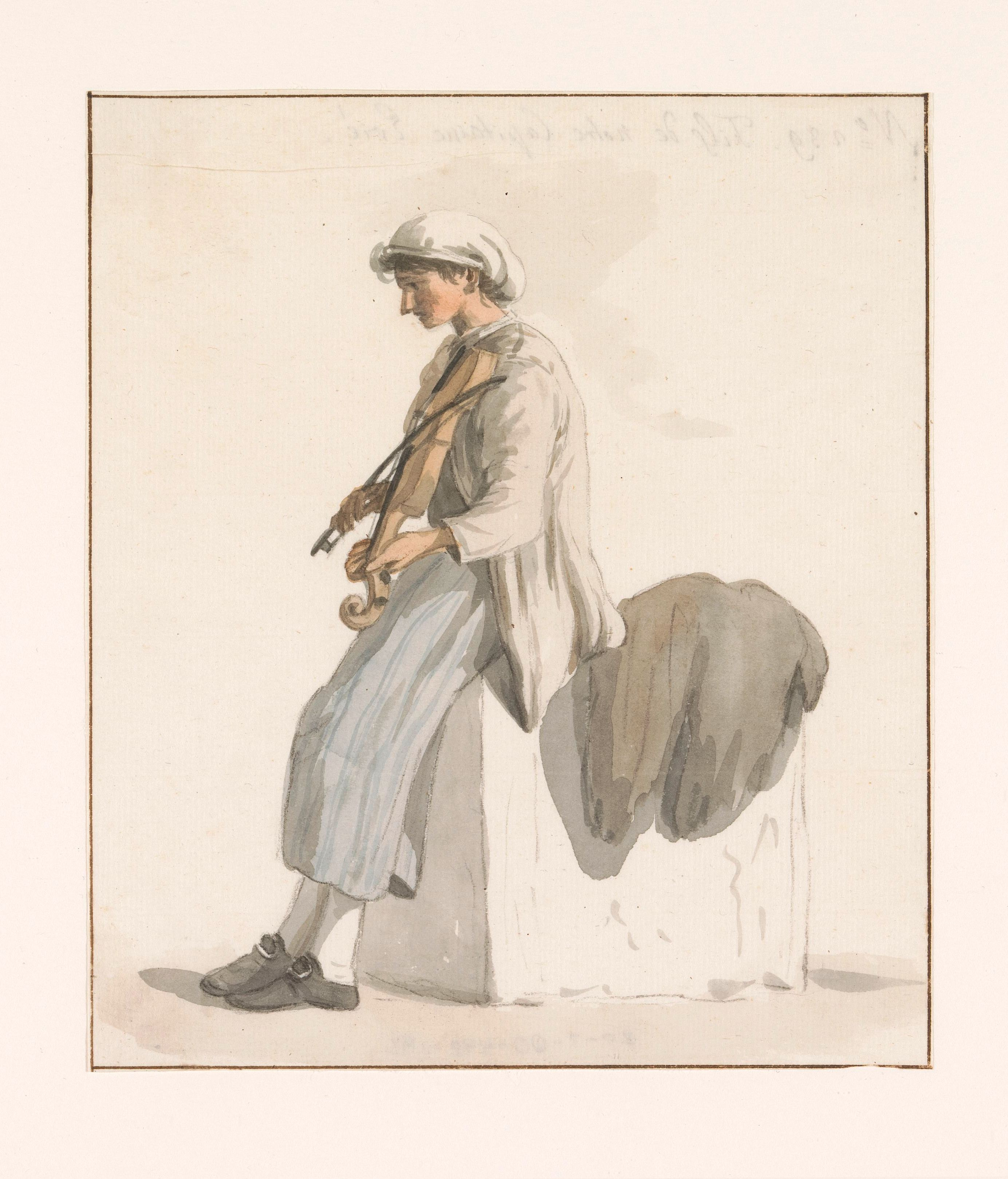
"Son of our captain Erié, with a violin" (album 'Voyage en Italie, en Sicile et à Malte - 1778') - Coll. Rijksmuseum, Amsterdam

Accompanied by the fellow Vaudois engraver Isaac-Jacob La Croix (CH, b. Payerne, 28 Dec.1751 – d. after 1800), who had worked in the workshop of Christian von Mechel in Basel, he departed for the Italian Peninsula In the summer of 1776 where he established himself in Rome, capital of the Papal States, at the end of that year. In 1778 he found employment as a specialist in topographical landscapes with Nicolas Ten Hove, a Dutch antiquary. That offered him the chance to be employed. In March 1778 by two Dutch noblemen, Willem Carel Dierkens and Willem Hendrik van Nieuwerkerke, to accompany them – later to be joined by Ten Hove and Nathaniel Thornbury – on a four-month voyage (from 10 April to 12 Aug). to Naples and its hinterland, the Mezzogiorno, the islands of Sicily and Malta where he created close to three hundred watercolours (held currently by the Rijksmuseum in Amsterdam, in 3 leather bound albums entitled "Voyage en Italie, en Sicile et à Malte – 1778"). The trip took them to the Kingdom of Naples in Southern Italy (Naples, Avellino, Canosa, Bari, Brindisi, Gallipoli, Taranto, Reggio Calabria), and, crossing the Strait of Messina, on a visit to the Kingdom of Sicily (Messina, Taormina, Catania, Syracuse), followed by an embarkation for Malta and Gozo, still parts of the Monastic State of the Knights of St. John at the time, then returning to Sicily (Agrigento, Palermo) and, finally, reaching Naples, their point of departure, by sea.

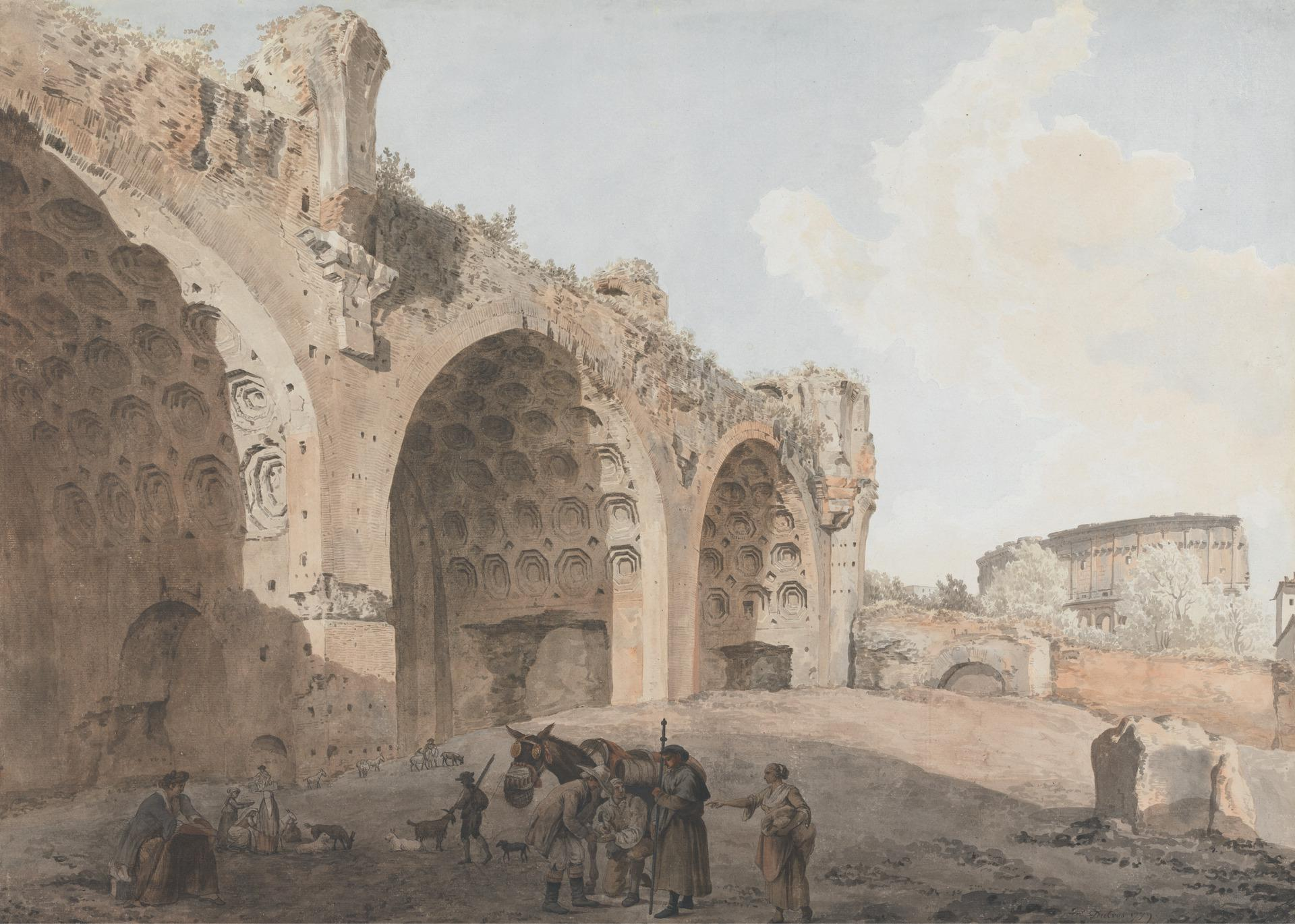
Ruins of the Basilica of Maxentius in the Forum Romanum, A-L-R Ducros, (c. 1779) - YCBA

He stayed in Rome from 1777 to 1793 at different locations in the Campo Marzio, the historic centre of Rome and place to be for artists and antiquarians as well as passing foreigners in the 18th century where he was working as a landscape painter, which was still considered the lesser art form at the time. Since he was unable to take on large religious commissions, which were reserved for Catholic painters, he realised that his salvation lay in passing foreigners, who were fond of picturesque views of the Italian countryside.

In 1780, Ducros is said to have commissioned an etching after one of his marine paintings to Raffaello Sanzio Morghen, a young engraver who had just entered the renowned studio of the highly skilled engraver Giovanni Volpato. A series of eight prints by Morghen after Ducros was later published between 1784 and 1786.

With remarkable judgement, Ducros joined forces with Volpato, who – although also considered a foreigner in the Papal States as he was born in the Venetian Republic –, enjoyed great prestige for his reproduction prints of Raphael's Stanze (a suite of four reception rooms decorated by Raffaello Sanzio da Urbino in the first half of the 16th century. for Pope Julius II and later for Pope Leo X, which are located on the 3rd floor of the Apostolic Palace, now part of the Vatican Museums) and benefited from the protection of Pope Pius VI Braschi.

In 1780, this collaboration with Volpato lead to the publication of a first series of twenty-four large-format hand-coloured engravings, in Rome, after his own watercolours depicting "Views of Rome and the Surrounding Countryside" ("Vues de Rome et de ses environs"), such as the watercolour "The Temple of Peace" aka "Ruins of the Basilica of Maxentius in the Roman Forum" (1779), a version of which is held at the Yale Center for British Art. From 1787 to 1792 Volpato worked on a second series, published in 1792, of 14 interior views of the Museo Pio-Clementino, also in collaboration with Louis Ducros.

In Rome, bustling street scenes featuring contemporaries in local attire became a successful genre in the 2nd half of the 18th century. Popular with tourists on their Grand Tour, they were an important source of income for foreign artists such as Jacques Sablet and Louis Ducros, both natives of the Swiss canton of Vaud. The pair worked briefly together in 1781–1782 to produce plain and coloured etchings. During that period, they published a series of twelve engravings, entitled Scènes et costumes italiens (Italian Scenes and Costumes). The engravings and aquatints, which excel at fine-grained detailing, were drawn by Sablet and engraved by Ducros to imitate wash ("lavis" in French), a technique perfected by Jean-Baptiste Le Prince to create the illusion of an original drawing. In 1782 Ducros also executed a large composition in wash together with Sablet: "Scène d'enterrement dans un cimetière" (Burial scene in a cemetery), in a landscape format, with numerous figures arranged in the manner of low-reliefs.

In 1782, Ducros opened his own workshop on the Strada della Croce, which also served as a very successful place of business for the next decade. He sold his works and engravings made with Volpato, Raffaello Morghen (Volpato's pupil and son-in-law) and his compatriot Jacques Sablet, but also views by competing artists such as Francesco Piranesi and Louis-Jean Desprez. The newspapers began to talk about him and wealthy travellers frequently visited his studio.

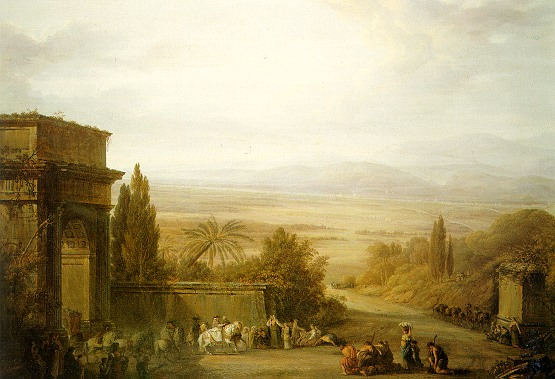
Visit of Pius VI to the Pontine Marshes, A-L-R Ducros (1786). Palazzo Braschi, Rome.

So, in 1782, he received a commission from the Grand Duke Paul Alexandrovitch of Russia for two oil paintings: the Grand Duke Paul and the Grand Duchess Maria at Tivoli and the Grand Duke Paul and his Suite at the Forum (both in Saint-Petersburg, Pavlovsk Palace). And, in 1783, he got a commission from Pope Pius VI, who asked to accompany him to Terracina to choose the viewpoint for a painting called Pius VI Visiting the Drainage Works at the Pontine Marshes (now in Peter & Paul Fortress, Saint-Petersburg) and in 1786 Ducros produced another version of the same event : Visit of Pius VI to the Pontine Marshes (now in Palazzo Braschi, Rome). By 1783 he had probably already begun to paint the large-scale watercolours that definitively established his notoriety.

In 1784, Gustav III of Sweden became his largest purchaser. The king's collection, containing a number of wash prints such as "The Sacrifice to Venus" and "The Sacrifice to Love", is still held today at the Drottningholm Palace, where a Museum of Antiquities was built in his honour shortly after the king's demise on 29 March 1792 following an assassination attempt two weeks earlier at a masqueraded ball.

"The Valley of the Nera" aka "Orage dans la vallée de la Nera" by Abraham-Louis-Rodolphe Ducros (Stourhead Coll.)

But his primary commissioners were still English noblemen on a Grand Tour of Europe, for example Sir Richard Colt Hoare, Milord Frederick Hervey, the Earl of Bristol, and Lord Breadalbane. In 1786 he had met Sir Richard Colt Hoare, a banker and art collector, who became his most important patron and who bought 13 of his landscapes between 1786 and 1793, which he exhibited in his castle at Stourhead in Wiltshire, where the young Romantic painter William Turner (1775–1851), a protégé of Colt Hoare, could admire them. Colt Hoare is said to have stated that "it is to Ducros that the first knowledge and power of watercolours must be attributed".

These landscapes included: "The Ruins of the Forum of Nerva with the Colonacce" (c. 1786), "The Stables of the Villa Maecenas" "Lake Trasimene, Early Morning", "View of Cività Castellana" , "The Interior of the Colosseum, Rome" , "The Arch of Constantine, Rome" , "The Arch of Titus, Rome", "The Ponte Lucano and the Tomb of the Plautii near Tivoli", "The Falls of Tivoli", "The Falls of the Velino into the Nera near Terni", "The Ruins of Augustus's Bridge over the Nera at Narni", "The River Nera by an Ilex Grove" and "The Valley of the Nera" (all in the National Trust collections at Stourhead, Wiltshire).

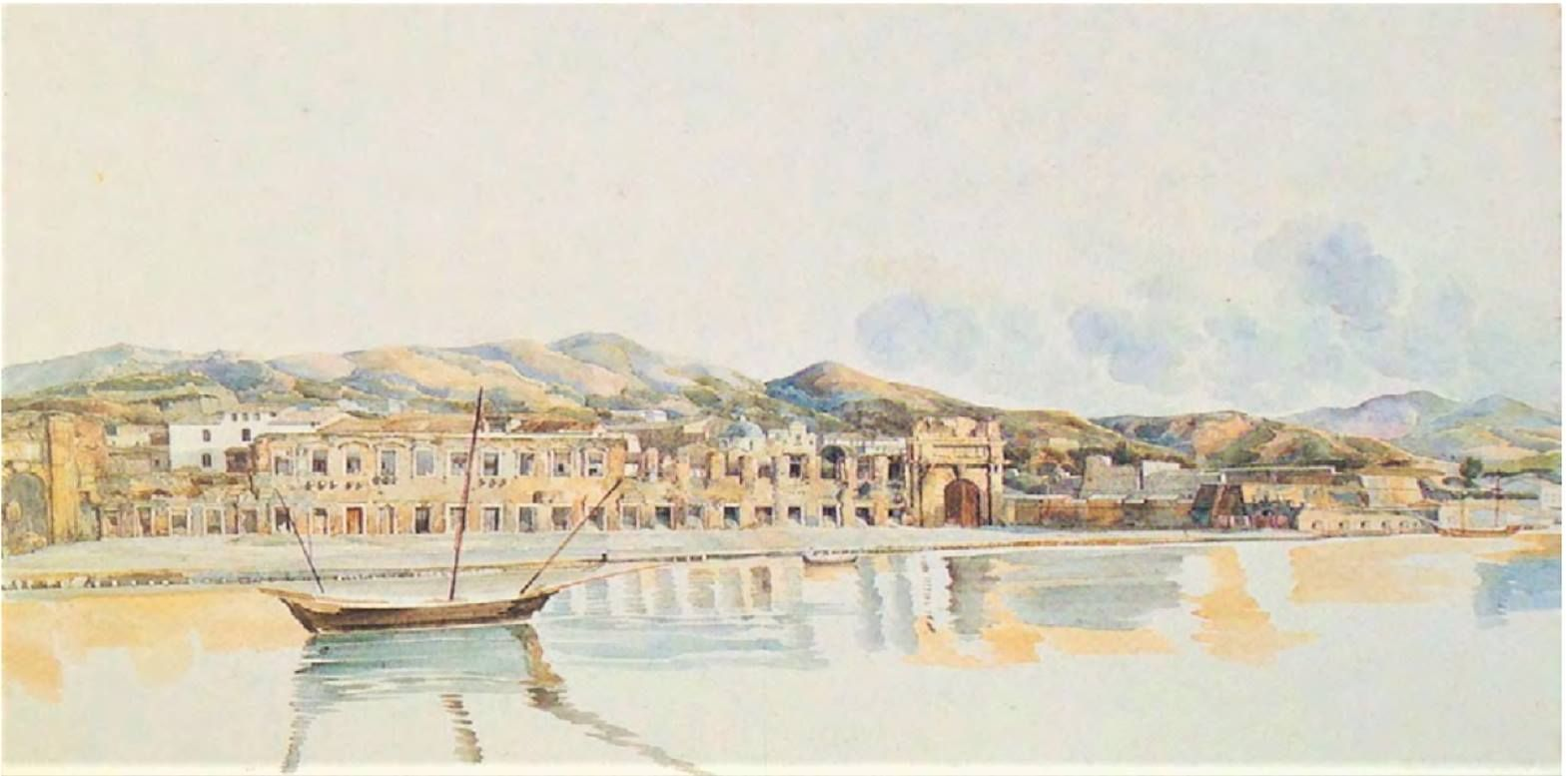
"View of Messina after the earthquake of 1783" (1789) by Abraham-Louis-Rodolphe Ducros (1748–1810); Coll. & Loc. unknown

Mario Verdone writes that Ducros travelled to Sicily and Malta between 1787 and 1789, but that remains to be seen as other sources place those visits a lot later or a lot sooner depending on which trip he may be referring to [see infra & supra], unless Ducros took still another trip around this time.

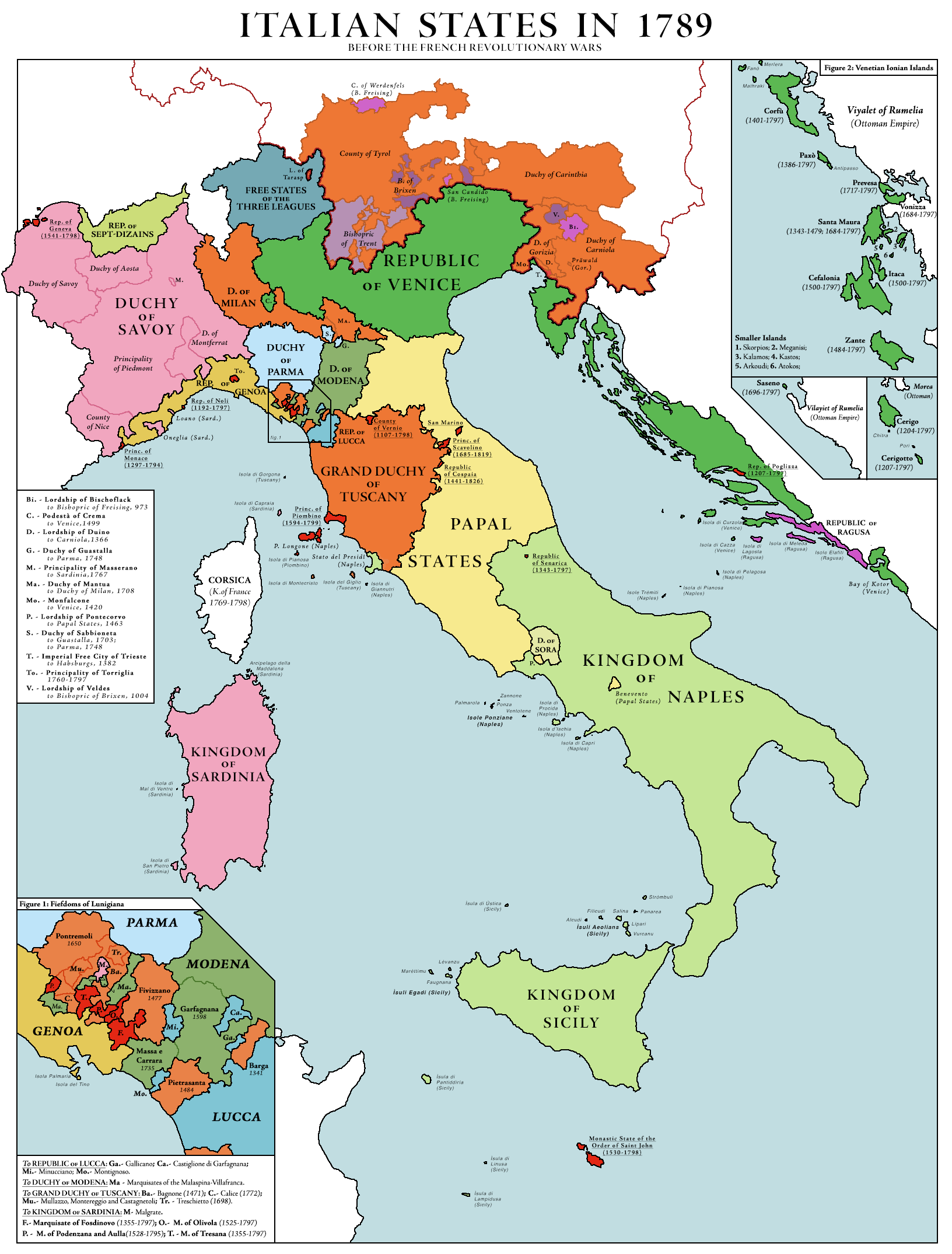
Map of the states on the Italian Peninsula in 1789, before the French revolutionary wars

The unrest arising from the French Revolution led to the expulsion of many French (and French speaking) from the Papal States. Ducros, accused of being a Jacobin, was also expelled - in spite of the efforts to intervene on his behalf by Princess Sofia Albertina, the sister of the Swedish King Gustav III – on 12th of February 1793, on direct orders of Cardinal Zelada, on a day's notice, with his belongings confiscated and his private collection looted; forced to abandon his studio and his business and virtually ruined, he took refuge for a few months in mountainous Abruzzo, painting large watercolours of these still little-visited territories (e.g. surroundings of Licenza, Monte Velino, the Liri valley, the Roveto valley and Capistriello). Unable to return to Rome, he settled in Naples until 1799, in the parish of S. Giuseppe a Chiaia, where he created numerous works depicting Campania and Mount Vesuvius. He sold some of his works to the diplomat and geologist William Hamilton and some marines (seascapes) to Lord Acton, Prime Minister of the Kingdom of Naples at the time, in charge of the reorganisation of the Neapolitan fleet of Ferdinand IV of Bourbon, for whom Ducros produced a series of views of the shipyards of Castellamare di Stabia. Ducros sold at least two prints featuring the Velino and Aniene waterfalls to Lord Breadalbane.

Ducros went back to Malta for a second time in 1800 and 1801, where he painted a series of large views of La Valletta for the General Thomas Graham, heading the British troops who had recently conquered the island after Napoleon's troops had invaded Malta in 1798. These include e.g. the View of the Grand Harbour, Valletta, now in Lausanne, at the Palais de Rumine; another version is in La Valletta, at the National Museum of Fine Arts (MUŻA).

=== Return home ===
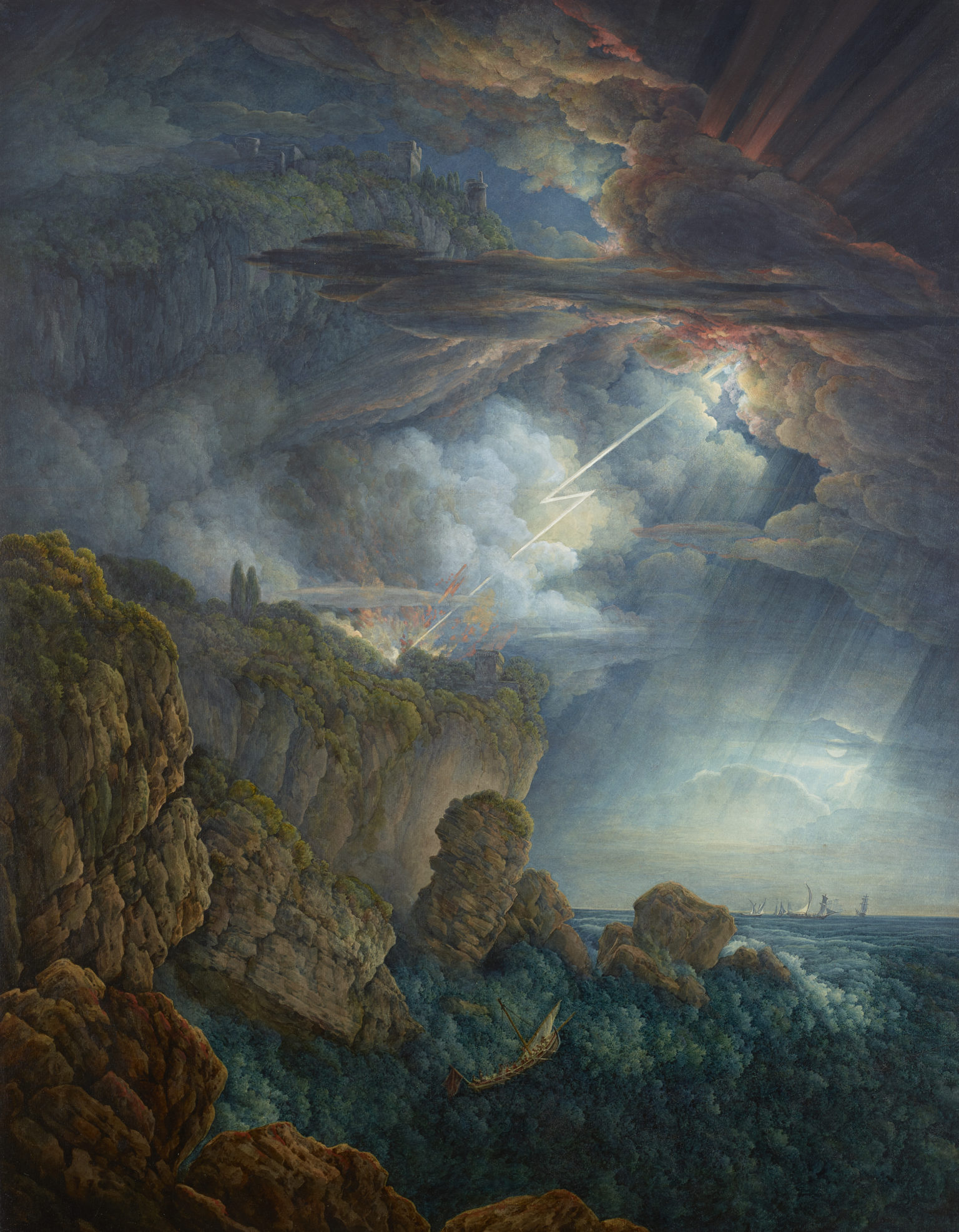
Night Storm at Cefalù, Louis Ducros (c. 1800–1805) - Musée cantonal des Beaux-Arts, Lausanne

"Vue du Grand Port de la Valette" (c. 1800–1801) by Adolphe-Louis-Rodolphe DuCros aka Louis Ducros; Musée cantonal des Beaux-Arts, Lausanne

Financially strained by the bankruptcy of his Neapolitan banker, Ducros returned to Switzerland in the summer of 1807, first of all to Nyon, where his brother Rodolphe Du Cros was a pastor, then to Lausanne, where he started to give private drawing lessons and tried, unsuccessfully, to convince the government of the Canton of Vaud to set up an Academy of Painting. In Geneva, he was named an honorary member of the Society of Arts in 1807. He was even more fortunate in Bern, where he exhibited his work and where he was supported by Sigmund Wagner, a prominent collector and art dealer. In Bern, the city authorities appointed Ducros professor of painting at the Academy in September 1809, but he died, of apoplexy, on 18 February 1810 in Lausanne, before having been able to assume the post.

== Work ==
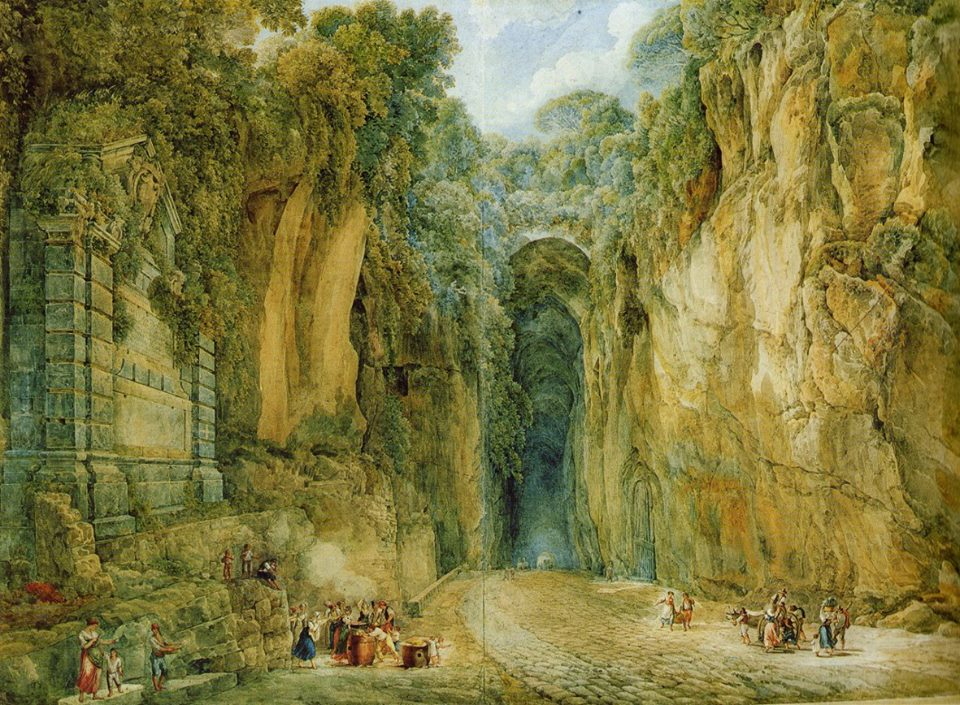
The Crypta Neapolitana, A-L-R Ducros (c. 1794–1800) - Musée cantonal des Beaux-Arts, Lausanne

Ducros is notable among water-colourists of his time for his large canvases, limited palette and forceful tones (achieved through application of gum) which allowed his paintings to be hung alongside oils at exhibitions. Ducros sold some of his paintings, including several to Sir Richard Colt Hoare, at whose estate of Stourhead they are still kept. However, he retained the majority of his paintings to use as the basis for engravings, which he readily sold to 'Grand Tour' travellers.

His landscapes are, for the most part, kept in the Cantonal Museum of Fine Arts in Lausanne (after the State of Vaud had bought his entire studio contents in 1816) and at the English estates of Stourhead and Bramall Hall. Other than the 13 watercolour paintings held at Stourhead, The National Trust collections in the UK harbour a number of other works by Ducros at estates under their patronage: 3 at Dunham Massey (Cheshire), 3 at Florence Court (County Fermanagh) and 6 at Coughton Court (Warwickshire).

All major museums hold a selection of Ducros' oeuvre : The MET, the British Museum, the Rijksmuseum, Drottningholm Palace, Lövstad Castle, Nationalmuseum, state museums in Russia, etc. Most is not on permanent view due to the fragility of the medium itself, best preserved in controlled dry and dark conditions.

== Style ==
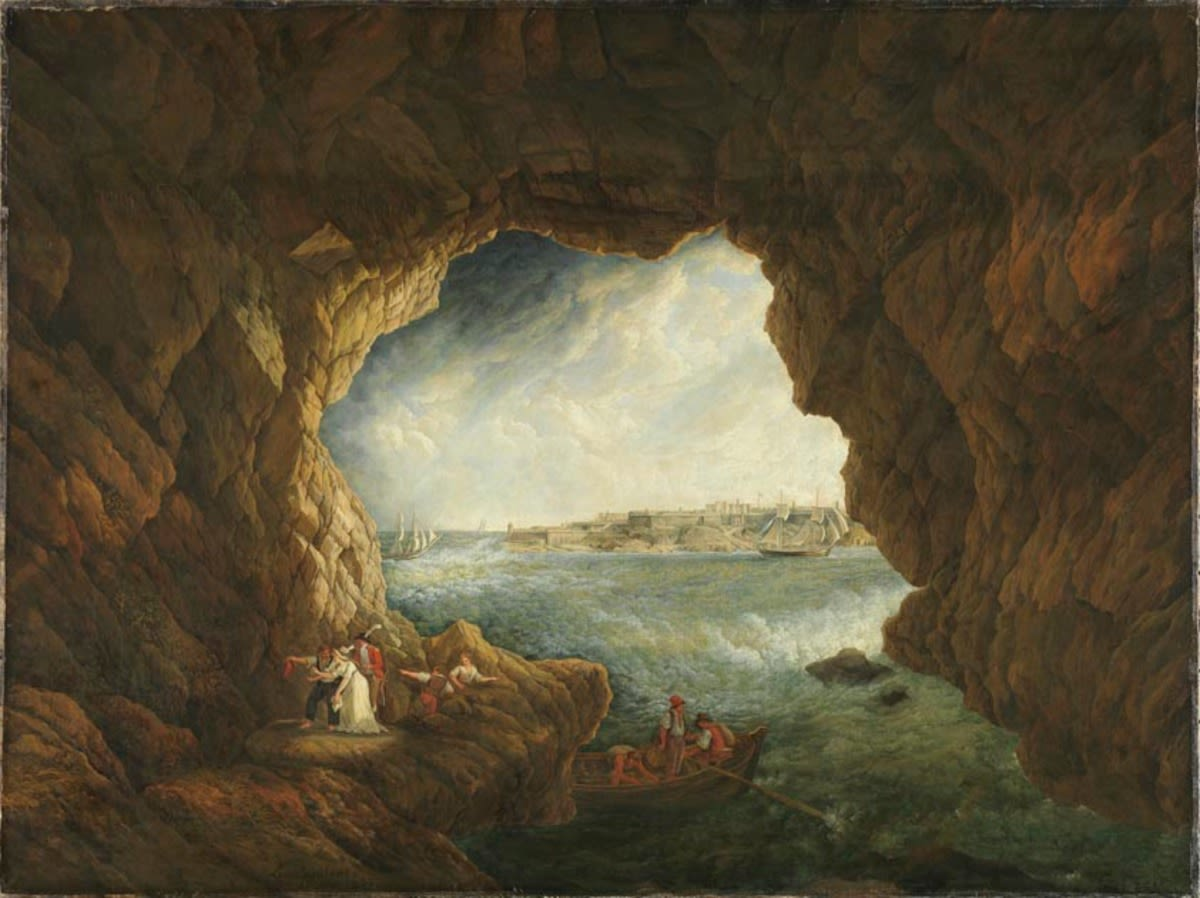
"Grotte auf Malta" aka "Grotto of the Pages in Malta", opposite Fort Ricasoli (1806), by Abraham-Louis-Rodolphe DUCROS (Coll. Bayerische Staatsgemäldesammlungen, Munich)

Imbued with the vision of the world of the minor Swiss masters, Ducros at first produced transparent topographical watercolours, such as the "Dessins de mon voyage dans les Deux-Siciles et à Malte" (1778), and other works in which the distribution of trees and the drawing of foliage bear witness to the heritage of Claude Lorrain. But his first "Roman" works show his ability to assimilate and reveal the rapid diversification of the means used to paint the landscape. He owes most of his skills to the engraver Giovanni Battista Piranesi: the use of dynamic imaging, the manipulation of landscape elements, the importance of scale, the use of large formats, all of which Ducros was able to integrate into his own vision without appropriating either the language or the theses of his illustrious predecessor. The prints made with Volpato, etchings watercoloured by hand, celebrate the marriage of the tradition of the reproduction prints of which Volpato is the heir and the artisan practice of coloured engravings in the "manner of Johann Ludwig Aberli" that Ducros introduced in Italy.

Ducros drew the scenes he chose with a fidelity that could not fail to make De la Rive affirm that «this reproduction of reality is due to the use of the camera obscura».

The mature watercolours reveal a restless artist whose works betray a progression towards shadow and enclosed spaces. The ancient ruins are becoming more and more overrun with vegetation. Thunderstorms, storms and volcanic eruptions bring the watercolours to life, no doubt in response to a demand from Anglo-Saxon patrons fond of the sublime and the neo-Gothic. Ducros became less and less a topographer and more and more a director. Both in the format of his works and in the intensity of the watercolours, often enhanced with gouache, or even oil, and covered with varnish or gum arabic, the painter tried to compete with oil painting. He also framed his watercolours and covered them with glass in order to be able to exhibit them in public. A protagonist of pre-Romanticism, Ducros contributed to the affirmation of landscape painting as an autonomous genre.

== Sources ==
- Agassiz, Daisy (1927). Abraham-Louis-Rodolphe Du Cros : peintre et graveur, 1748-1810 [Abraham-Louis-Rodolphe Du Cros : painter and engraver, 1748-1810]. Revue Historique Vaudoise (in French). Vol. 35e année. Lausanne: Éditions Spes. pp. 3–14, 33–40, 65–76, 97–104, 128–138.
- Verdone, Mario (1956). Carriera romana dell'acquarellista Du Cros, (in Italian). [The Roman career of watercolourist Du Cros] in Strenna dei Romanisti, Vol. XVII, 1956, pp. 206–212 (pp. 144 - 148 in scan)
- Chessex, Pierre (1982). « Quelques documents sur un aquarelliste et marchand vaudois à Rome à la fin du XVIIIe: A.L.R. Ducros (1748–1810) », Revue historique vaudoise, n° 90, pp. 35–71
- Chessex, Pierre; Haskell, Francis (1985). Roma romantica. Vedute di Roma e dei suoi dintorni di A.L.R. Ducros [Romantic Rome : views of Rome and its surroundings by A.L.R. Ducros] (in Italian). Milan: Franco Maria Ricci. ISBN 978-88-216-0110-1.
- Chessex, Pierre; Zutter, Jörg; Stainton, Lindsay; Prioul, Didier (1998). Abraham-Louis-Rodolphe Ducros : un peintre suisse en Italie. Lausanne: Musée cantonal des Beaux-Arts. ISBN 978-88-8118-363-0.
