= Charles Joseph Auriol =

Swiss painter

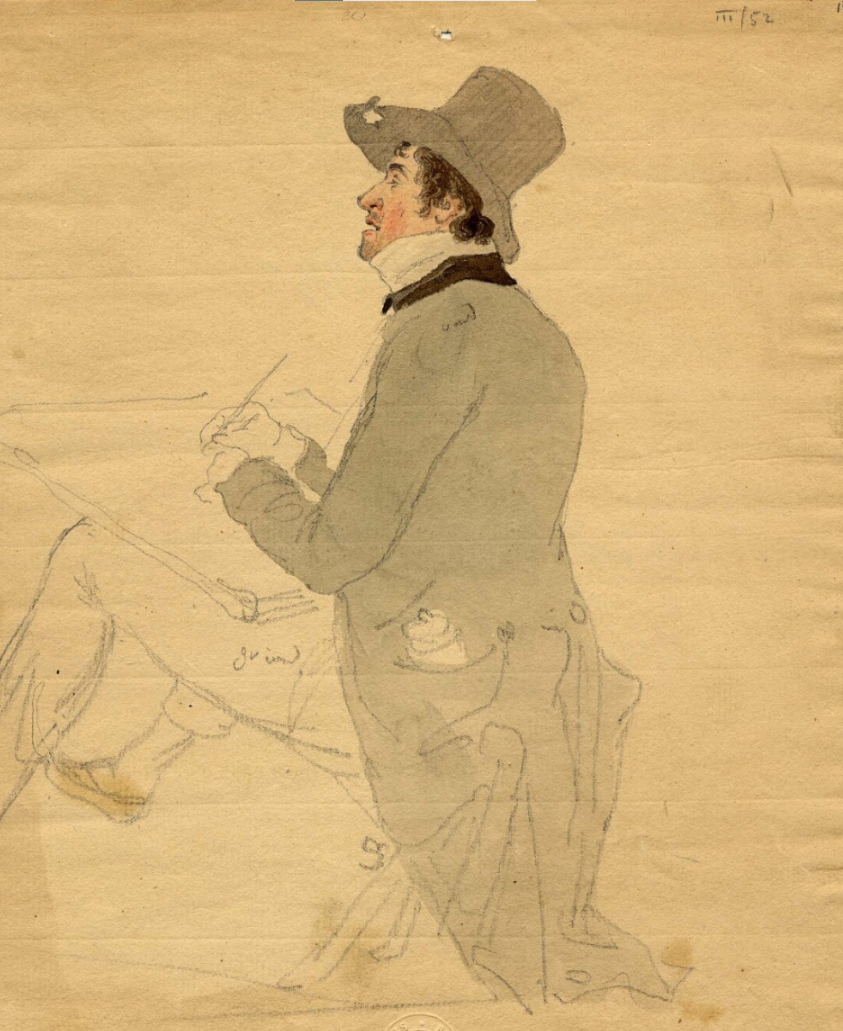
Portrait by Wolfgang-Adam Töpffer, c. 1810

Charles Joseph Auriol (13 November 1778, Geneva - 25 May 1834, Satigny) was a Swiss landscape painter.

== Biography ==
He was the son of Pierre-Elisée d’Auriol (1736–1790), a Colonel in the service of the Kingdom of Sardinia, and Anne-Elisabeth Turrettini. He began as a student of Pierre-Louis de La Rive in Bern, then studied with François-André Vincent and Anne Louis Girodet-Trioson in Paris.

After a stay in Rome, he settled in Geneva, in 1810. The following year, he married Anne-Jeanne Marguerite Dunant (c.1790-1847), of Genoa. They had two children; Philippe Élisé Auriol (1814–1866) and Louis Philippe Gustave Auriol (1816–1882). His first exhibit came in 1798, in Geneva, followed by 1812 in Paris and, from 1817 to 1830, in Zürich and Bern.

In 1816, he became a member of the Schweizerischer Kunstverein and a board member of the Gesellschaft der Kunstfreunde (Society of Friends of the Arts). His works show elements of both classicism and romanticism. Clouds or fog form the backgrounds for many of his paintings. His friend, the artist Wolfgang-Adam Töpffer, gave him the nickname, Nebelmaler (Fog Painter).

== Selected works ==
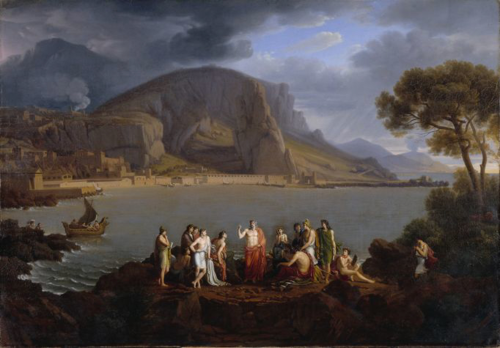
Plato teaching his disciples at Cape Sounion (1810)

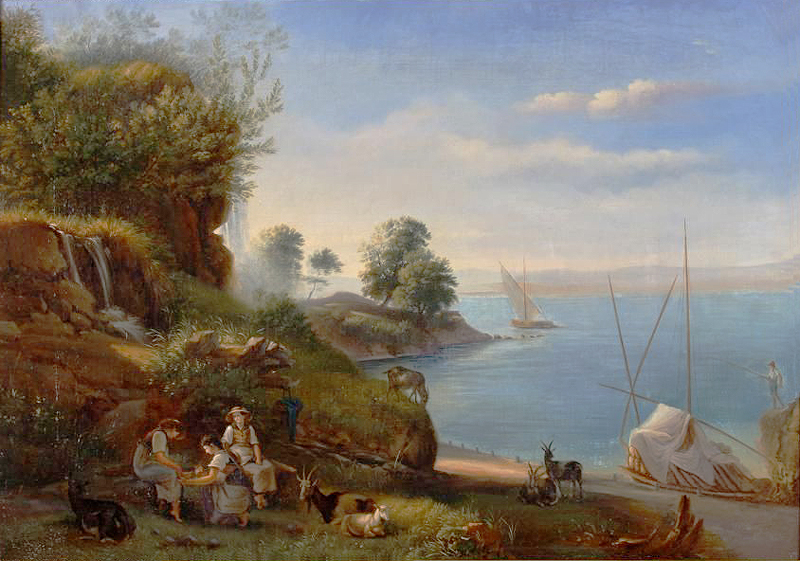
Landscape with Lake Geneva (1814)

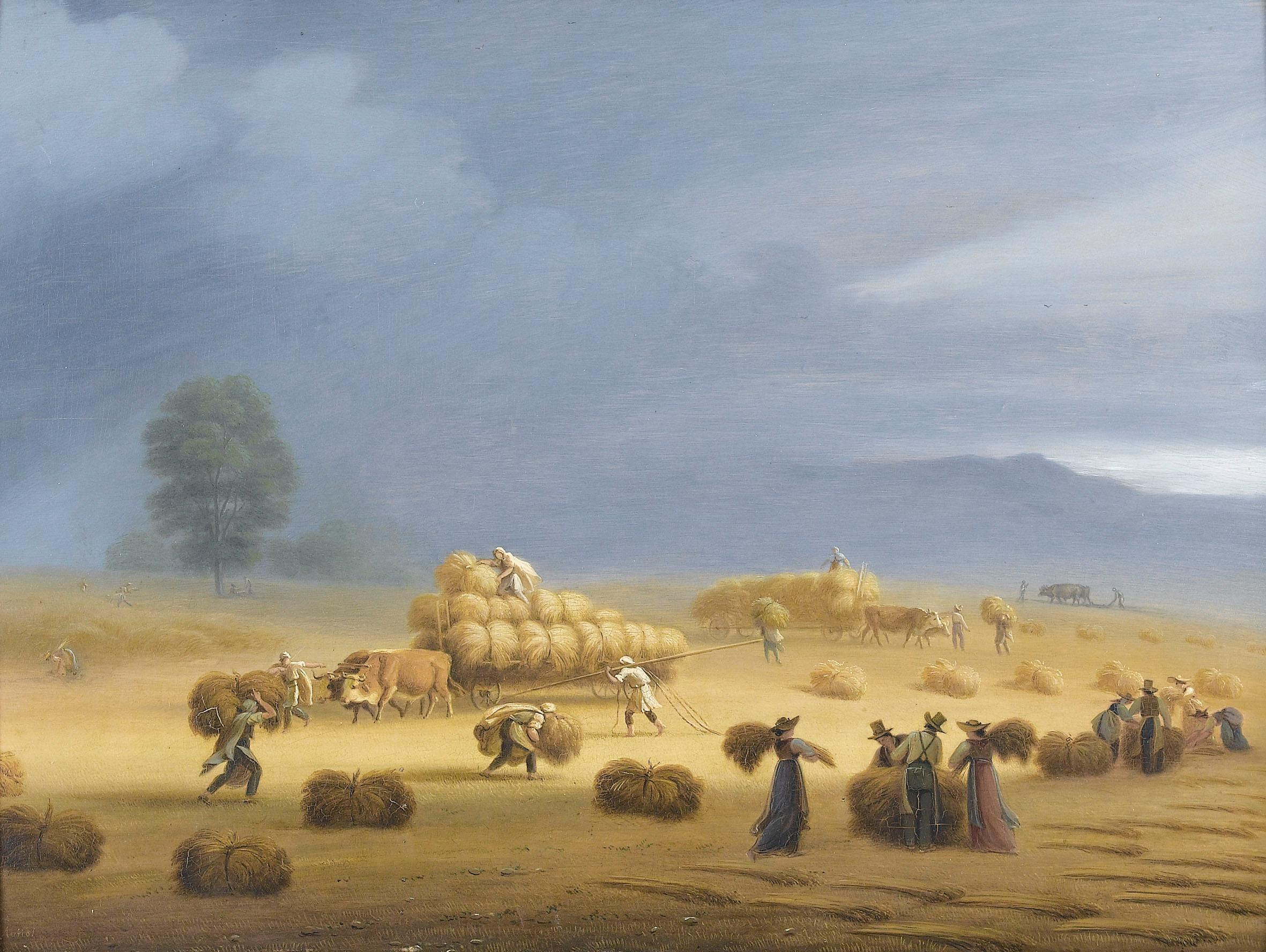
Farmers with carts harvesting in the field

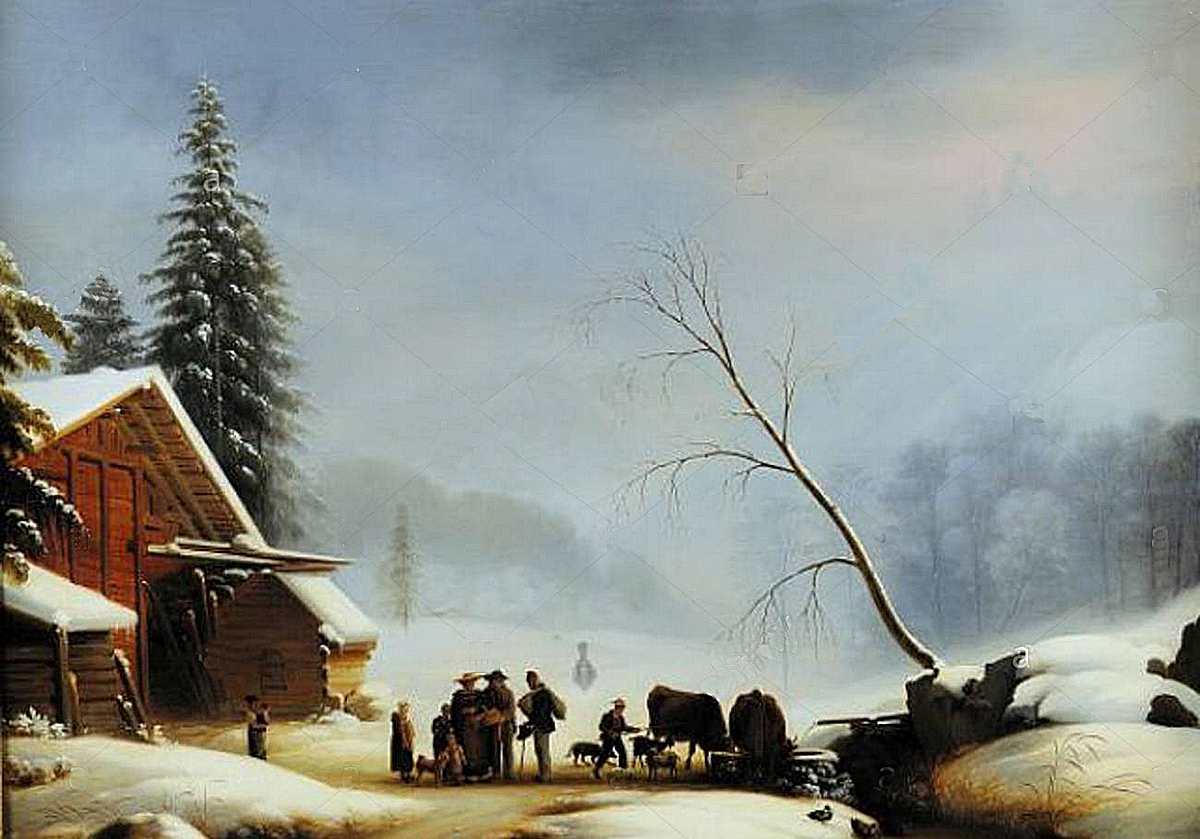
Landscape

== Sources ==
- "Auriol, Charles Joseph". SIKART Lexicon on art in Switzerland..
- Auriol, Charles Joseph in German, French and Italian in the online Historical Dictionary of Switzerland.
- (in German) Gudrun Libnow: Auriol, Charles Joseph. In: Allgemeines Künstlerlexikon. Die Bildenden Künstler aller Zeiten und Völker (AKL). Band 5, Saur, München u. a. 1992, ISBN 3-598-22745-0, S. 673
- Carl Brun (Ed.): Schweizerisches Künstler-Lexikon. Vol.1. Huber & Co., Frauenfeld 1908, pg.63 (Online).
