= List of pupils of Gustave Boulanger =

This is a list of the pupils of the 19th-century French painter Gustave Boulanger.

- Marie Bashkirtseff
- Jules Benoit-Lévy
- Maurice Bompard
- Jules Boquet
- Louis-Robert Carrier-Belleuse
- Maurice Chabas
- Louis Chalon
- Charles Cottet
- Walter Lofthouse Dean
- Hermann Delpech
- Thomas Dewing
- Henri Lucien Doucet
- Arthur Wesley Dow
- Jacques Drogue
- Adolph Duclos
- Hans Emmenegger
- Maximilienne Guyon
- Osman Hamdi Bey
- Childe Hassam
- Louis Welden Hawkins
- George Hitchcock
- Paul Jamin
- William Lees Judson
- Alice De Wolf Kellogg
- François-Maurice Lard
- Ernst Friedrich von Liphart
- Gari Melchers
- Willard Metcalf
- Thomas Corsan Morton
- Alphonse Mucha
- Théophile Poilpot
- Magdeleine Real del Sarte
- Léon Richet
- Alexander Ignatius Roche,
- Georges Rochegrosse
- Marius Roy
- Earl Shinn
- Guido Sigriste
- Elmer Boyd Smith
- Edmund C. Tarbell
- Francis Tattegrain
- Henry Tenré
- Louis Valtat
- Harry Watrous
- Albert Beck Wenzell
- Michel Willenich
