= Auguste Veillon =

Swiss artist (1834–1890)

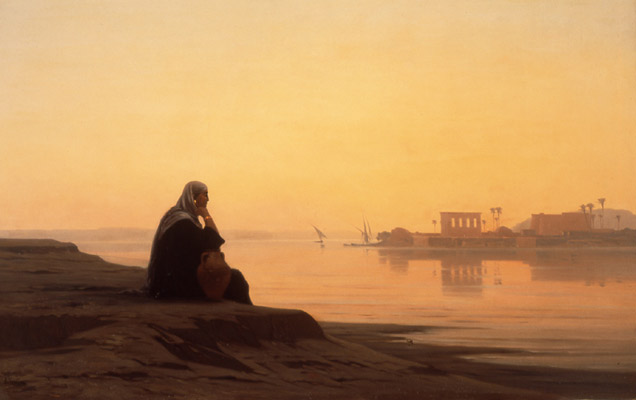
- The Nile at Philae
- Born: Louis-Auguste Veillon; 29 December 1834; Bex
- Died: 5 January 1890 (aged 55); Geneva
- Education: François Diday, Geneva; Ecole des Beaux-Arts, Paris
- Known for: Painter
- Movement: Orientalist

Louis-Auguste Veillon (29 December 1834, in Bex – 5 January 1890, in Geneva) was a Swiss painter, noted for his Orientalist works.

== Life and career ==
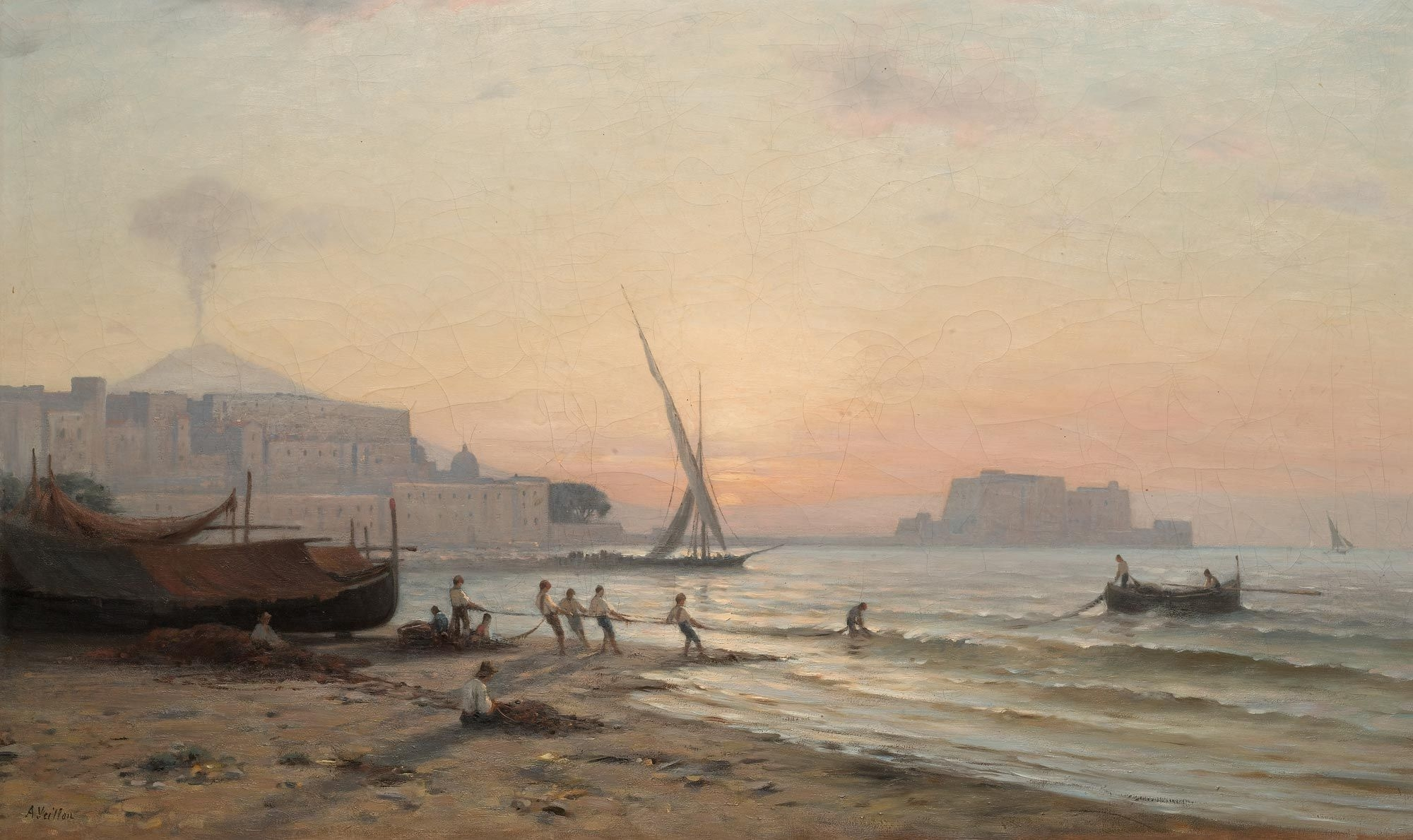
The Fishermen of the Naples Region

After obtaining a degree in Reformed theology in Lausanne, he joined François Diday at his studio in Geneva, where he primarily painted seascapes and mountain scenes from the Bernese Oberland. In 1858, he enrolled at the Ecole des Beaux-Arts in Paris. While in Paris, he spent a considerable amount of time in the Louvre, copying the works of the masters, especially the 17th-century Dutch masters and the work of Claude Lorrain. He later reported that this discipline led him to the luminism characteristic of his paintings.

In Paris, he made the acquaintance of the Orientalist artist, Eugène Fromentin who was his neighbour. This marked a turning point in Veillon's work and aroused his interest in Orientalist subject matter. He traveled to Rome, the Netherlands, Switzerland and Egypt, then lived in Venice for two years, before settling down in Geneva.

Veillon travelled to Egypt at least four times. In 1873, he stayed there with his friend, the artist, Etienne Duval (1824-1919), for a period of four months. In Egypt, he focussed on producing work with Orientalist themes, featuring landscapes showing the Nile or the Dead Sea. His works were very popular, especially in Switzerland.

Although he travelled extensively, Geneva remained at the centre of his life and work. He died there on 5 January 1890 at the age of 55 years.

== Work ==
Veillon distanced himself from the Romantic school of his master, Diday, instead pursuing a more realistic approach. He used soft brush strokes and a slightly pastel colour palette.

'Select list of paintings

- Bedouins at Rest
- Bord du Lac à Rivaz (Lakeshore at Rivaz)
- Les Pêcheurs de la Région de Naples, (Fishermen of the Naples Region)
- La Punta della Dogana, Venise (Dogana Bridge, Venice)
- Dutch River Landscape with the town of Dordrecht in the background
- Tunis
- Calm Water
- The Temple of Philae, Aswan

== See also ==
- List of Orientalist artists
- Orientalism
