= Töpffer =

Töpffer is a surname. Notable people with the surname include:

- Rodolphe Töpffer (1799–1846), Swiss teacher, author, painter, cartoonist, and caricaturist
- Wolfgang-Adam Töpffer (1766–1847), Swiss painter
