= Mosengel =

Mosengel is a surname. Notable people with the surname include:

- Adolf Mosengel (1837–1885), German landscape painter
- Johann Josua Mosengel (1663–1731), German pipe organ builder
