= François Diday =

Swiss artist (1802–1877)

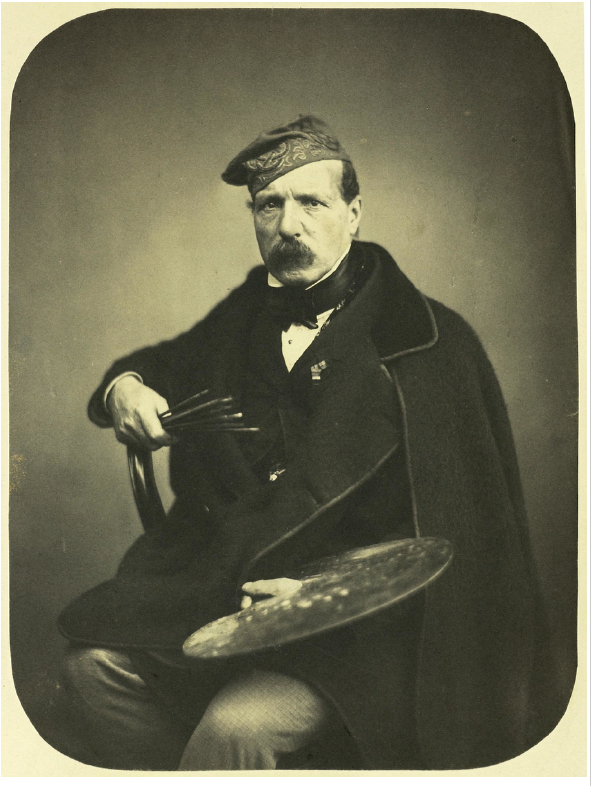
Photo taken in 1859, from the collections of the Bibliothèque de Genève

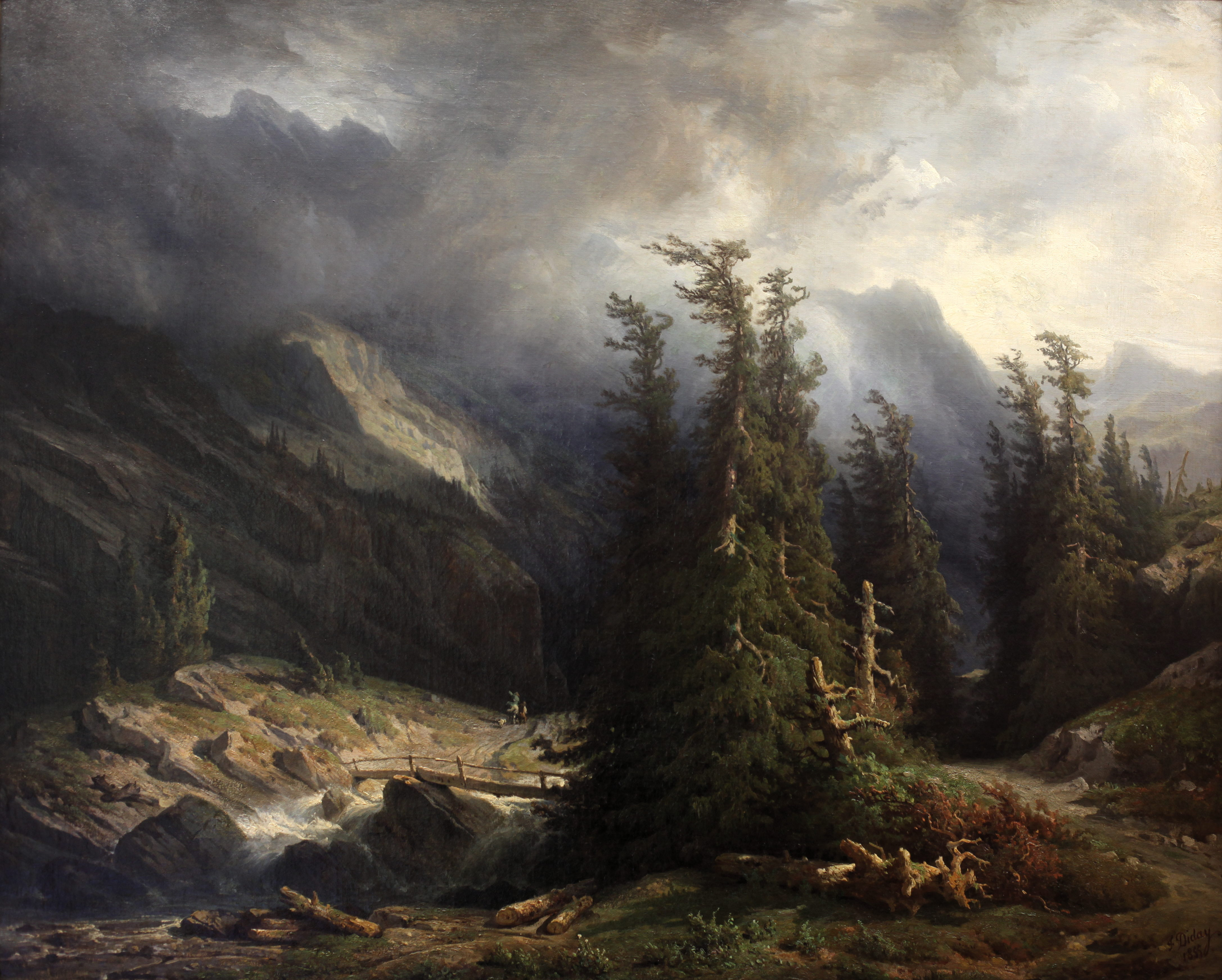
Path from Grimsel to Handeck, 1855, now in the Valais Art Museum in Sion, Switzerland

François Diday (12 February 1802, Geneva - 28 November 1877, Geneva) was a Swiss landscape painter and art promoter.

== Biography ==
His father was a watchmaker and scrap dealer. His mother worked as a tailor. After completing his primary education, he chose not to attend college, deciding instead to learn German and take drawing lessons from Abraham-Louis-Théodore Constantin-Jetzeler (1782-1847). He began his professional education in earnest at the Arts Society and took lessons from the landscape painters, Charles Joseph Auriol and Wolfgang-Adam Töpffer.

In 1821, he continued his education in Paris, where he worked at the studios of Antoine Gros then, in 1824, received a small scholarship from the Arts Society to study in Italy. He went to Rome, accompanied by his friend Adrien Rival (1802-1825). They also stayed briefly in Naples, but ran out of money and Rival became ill, so they had to return in 1825. He soon developed a preference for painting mountainous landscapes in the Bernese Highlands, Savoy and around Lake Geneva. Around 1830, he opened a studio and gave lessons. One of his first students was Alexandre Calame, only a few years younger than he. Later, they would become friendly rivals. For many years, he lived with his mother in Salève.

During the 1840s, he received numerous medals at exhibitions in Switzerland. He also exhibited in Paris, Berlin, London and Brussels. In 1873, he was awarded a bronze medal at the Vienna World's Fair.

In addition to his artistic activities, he served as an officer under General Guillaume Henri Dufour during the Neuchâtel Crisis, rising to the rank of Major, and was elected to the Conseil Municipal of Geneva in 1854. He served in that capacity for twenty-five years. In his will, he left a bequest of 100 drawings and sketches that would be sold to establish the "Fondation Diday".

He is buried at the Cimetière des Rois. A street in Geneva, the "Rue François Diday", has been named after him.
