= Adolf Mosengel =

German painter (1837–1885)

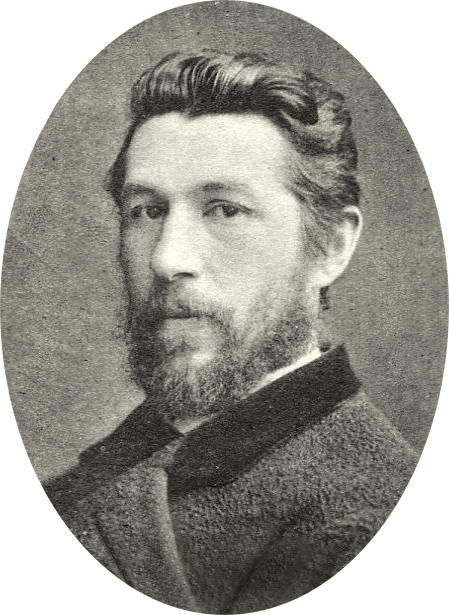
Adolf Mosengel in 1880

Adolf Mosengel (1 January 1837 – 12 June 1885) was a landscape painter from Hamburg, Germany. He initially built a reputation painting Alpine scenes, and later turned to scenes from Westphalia.

== Biography ==
Mosengel was born on 1 January 1837, in Hamburg. From 1854 to 1857, Mosengel studied at the Kunstakademie Düsseldorf under Hans Gude, and from 1858 to 1859 in Paris. In 1861, he studied in Geneva with Alexandre Calame, before settling in Hamburg, where he joined the Hamburg Artists' Association. In 1879, he travelled to the lakes of Northern Italy, where he painted en plein air.

He mainly worked as a landscape painter and found his subjects in his surroundings. In Düsseldorf, for example, the painting "Westphalian Landscape" (1857) was created; oil paintings, watercolors and drawings with views of many regions of Switzerland, such as "Mill near Geneva" (1861) and "Motif from the Bernese Oberland" (1866), and others from Tyrol, Franconia, the Rhine and Nahe, date from his time in Geneva and afterwards in Moselle as well as from northern Germany. Works from the 1870s, which document a significant further development in his artistic style, refer to stays in Italy or on the northern Italian lakes. His work was represented in exhibitions in Hamburg, and also in Berlin, Bremen, Hanover, Stuttgart and Vienna. The Hamburg Artists' Association honoured him in 1885 with a memorial exhibition.

In summer 1870, Mosengel met Friedrich Nietzsche and his sister, who were spending the season in the Maderanertal, a valley at the northern foot of the Saint-Gotthard Massif which has been compared to Mount Parnassus. Mosengel and the Nietzsches were staying in the Hotel Alpenclub. The Franco-Prussian War was about to break out, and Nietzsche had been considering joining the Prussian medical corps; apparently Mosengel "strengthened [his] resolve to do so". Besides Leopold Rau, Mosengel is likely the only painter Nietzsche knew personally.

Mosengel died on 12 June 1885, aged 48.

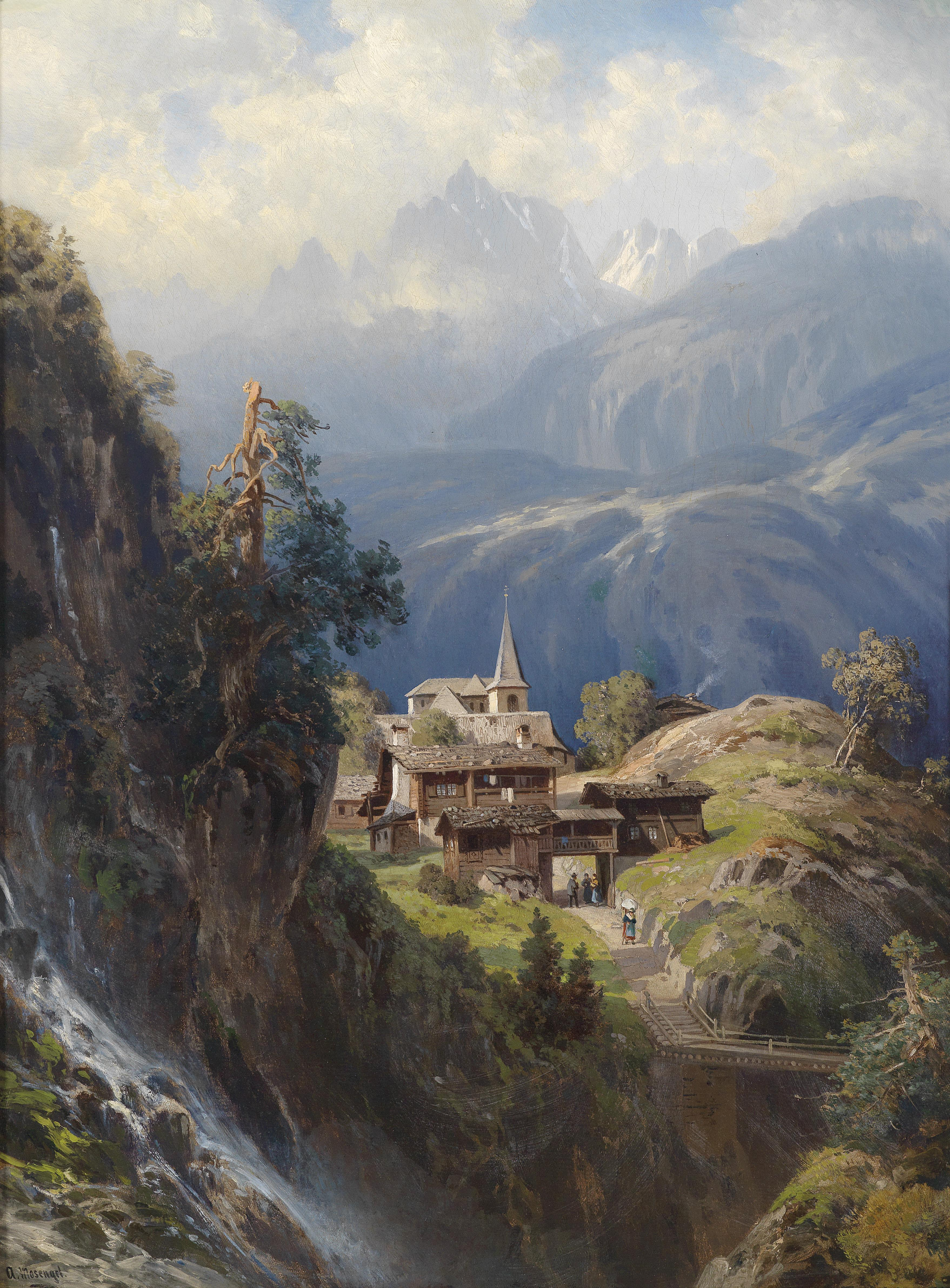
Village in the Bernese Alps

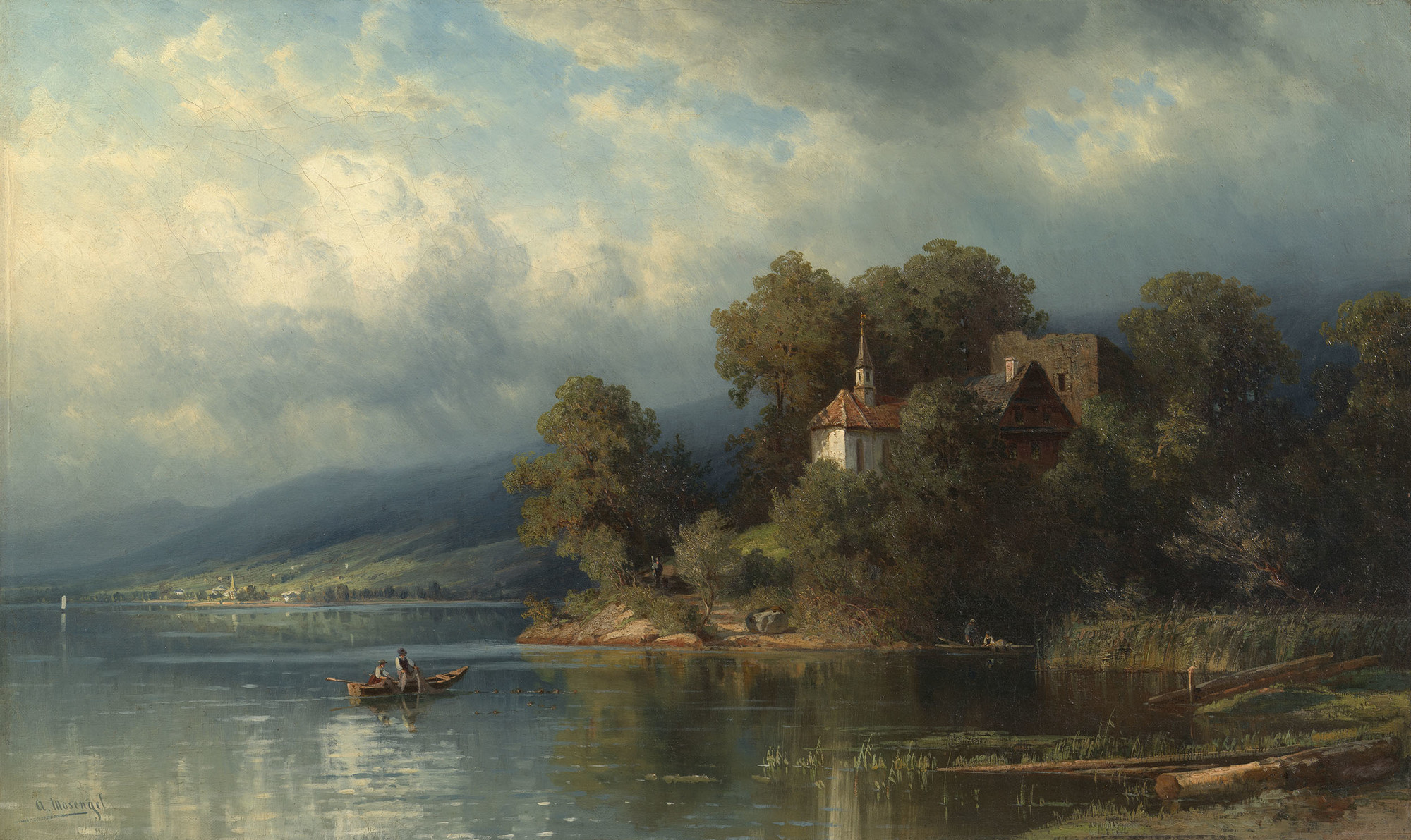
Chapel on the Lake of Lowerz, Royal Collection

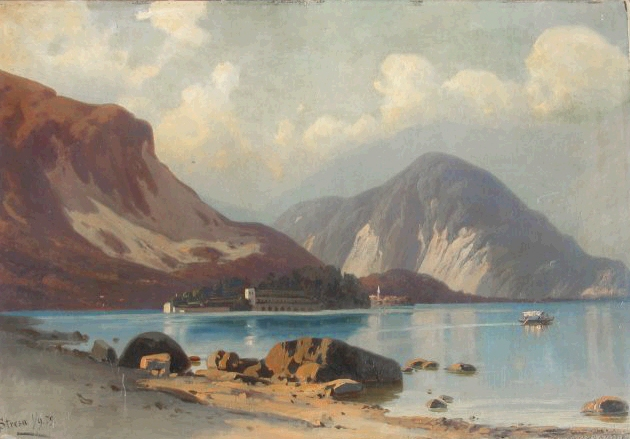
Isola Bella from Stresa, 1879

== See also ==
- Rudolf Koller
