= Alexandre Calame =

Swiss painter (1810–1864)

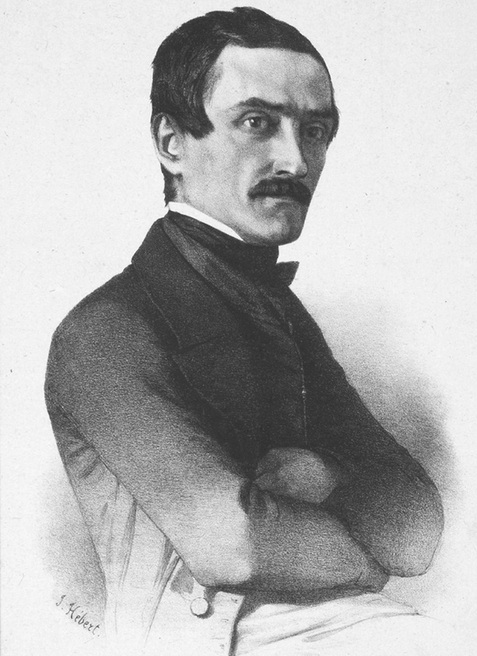
Alexandre Calame

Alexandre Calame (28 May 1810 – 19 March 1864) was a Swiss landscape painter, associated with the Düsseldorf School.

== Biography ==
He was born in Arabie at the time belonging to Corsier-sur-Vevey, today a part of Vevey. He was the son of a skillful marble worker in Vevey, but because his father lost the family fortune, Calame could not concentrate on art, but rather he was forced to work in a bank from the age of 15. When his father fell from a building and then died, it was up to the young Calame to provide for his mother.

Swiss Landscape (1830)

In his spare time he began to practice drawing small views of Switzerland. In 1829 he met his patron, the banker Diodati, who made it possible for him to study under landscape painter François Diday. After a few months he decided to devote himself fully to art.

In 1835 he began exhibiting his Swiss-Alps and forest paintings in Paris and Berlin. He became quite well known, especially in Germany, although Calame was more a draughtsman than an illustrator. He is associated with the Düsseldorf school of painting. In 1842 he went to Paris and displayed his works Mont Blanc, the Jungfrau, the Brienzersee, the Monte Rosa and Mont Cervin. He taught in Geneva, where Adolf Mosengel was one of his pupils.

He went to Italy in 1844 and brought back from Rome and Naples countless paintings, among them one of the ruins of Paestum (in the city museum in Leipzig). He showed that he was capable of understanding Italian nature; but the Alps remained his speciality.

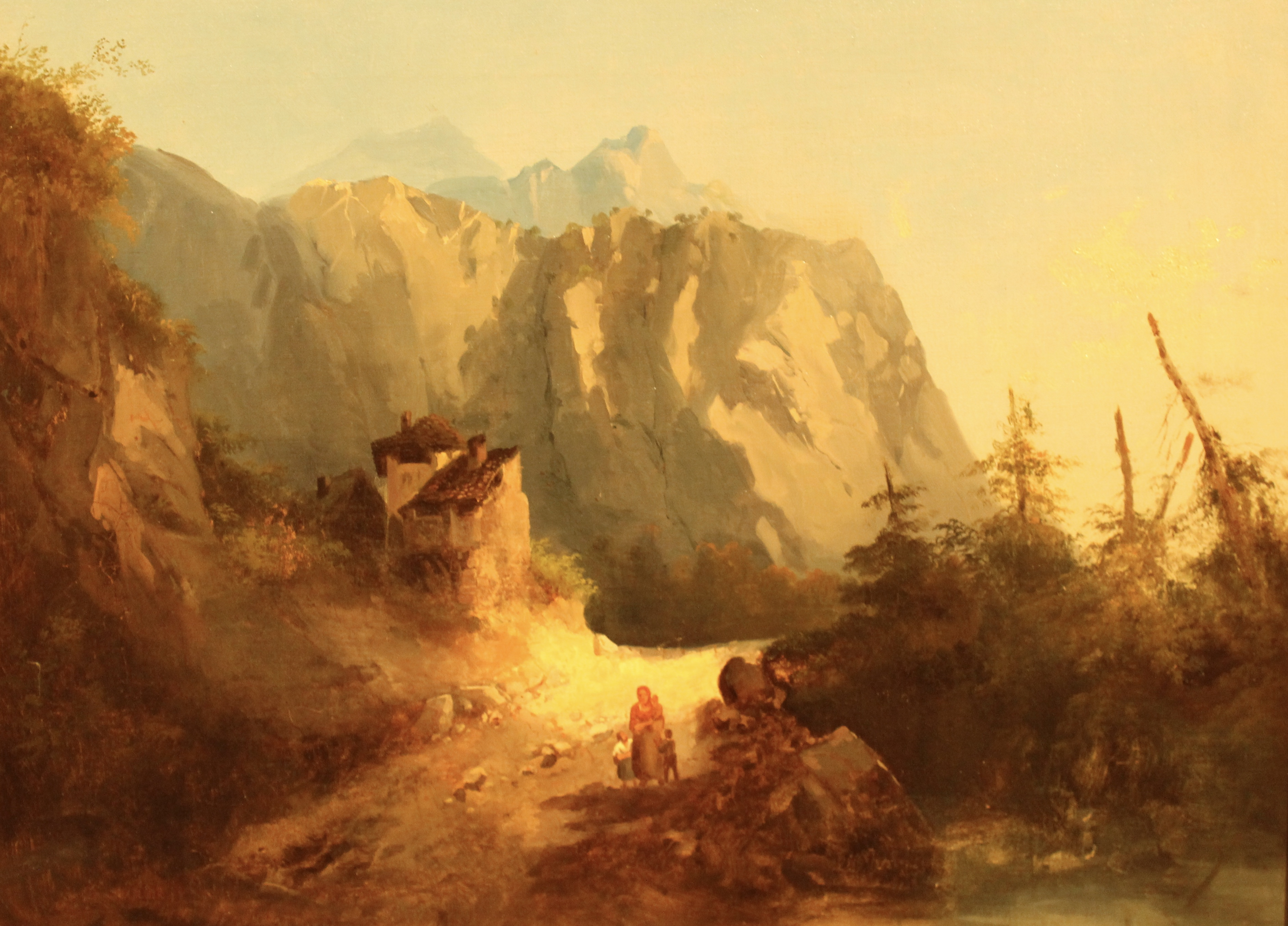
Alpine Mountain Scene, Widener University Art Museum Alfred O. Deshong Collection

The glaciers, emerald-green, white foaming mountain water, which split the trees during the storm, and the whipped clouds, the multi-colored rocks, half masked from fog, in the rays of the gleaming sun, are those things, which he knew to be true to nature. The Handeckfall from Bernese upper country, in Tirol, Lake Lucerne, the forest tower (in the urban museum of Leipzig), the forest stream (Dresdener gallery) etc.

One of his most ingenious works is the representation of the four seasons and times of the day in four landscapes, a spring morning in the south, a summer midday in the Nordic flatlands, an Autumn evening, and a winter night on a mountain. He became popular with these large works, and his popularity grew with smaller pieces and lithographs, namely 18 studies of Lauterbrunnen and Meiringen and the 24 sheets of Alpine passes. These were widespread in France, England, and Germany and are still today used to teach this style of painting.

Calame became a correspondent of the Royal Institute of the Netherlands in 1850, he resigned the next year.

He died in Menton, France, in 1864.

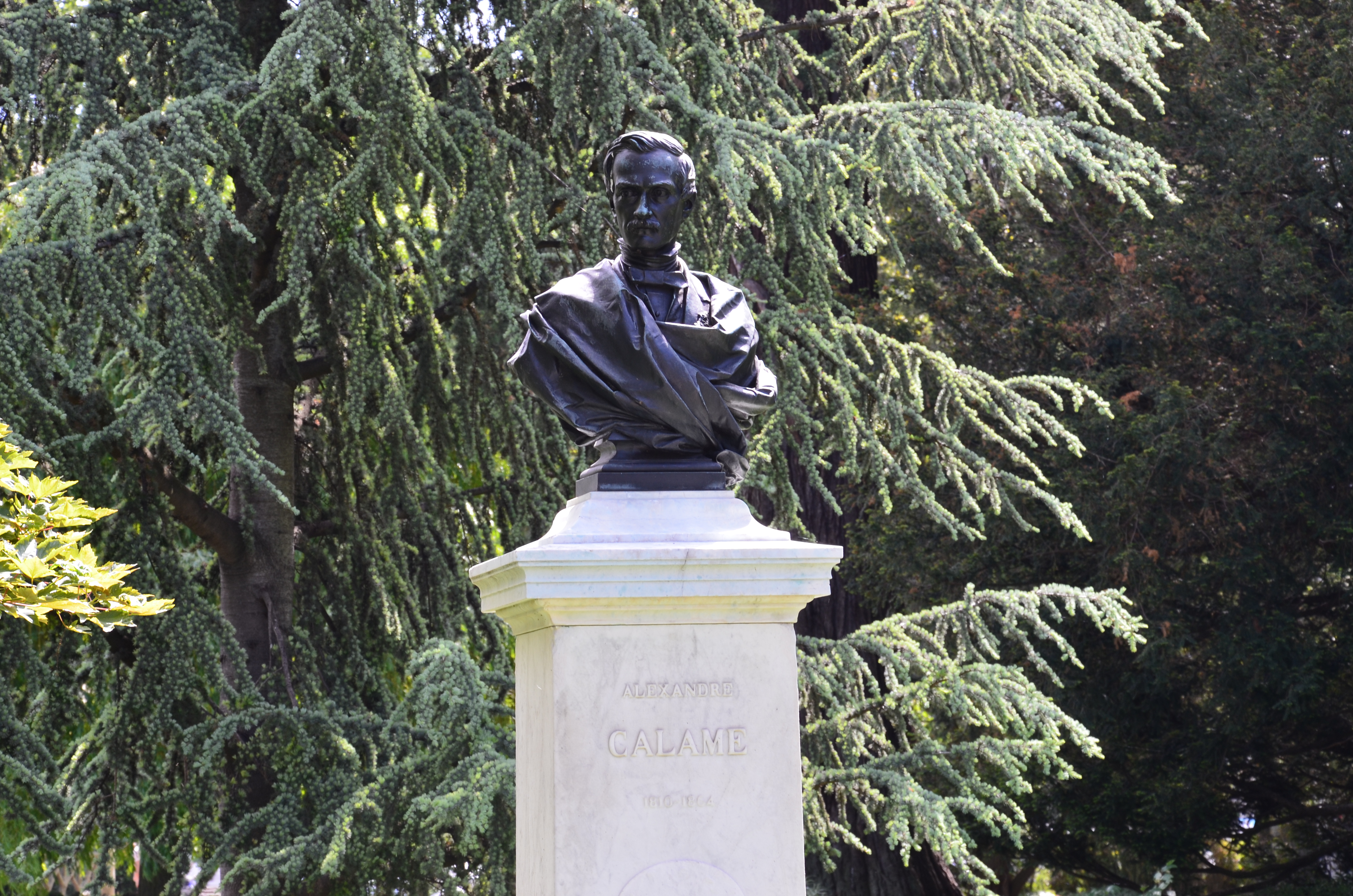
Alexandre Calame monument. Geneva

An exhibition featuring more than thirty of Calame's paintings was held at the Sterling and Francine Clark Art Institute in Williamstown, Massachusetts in 2006.

== Selected works ==
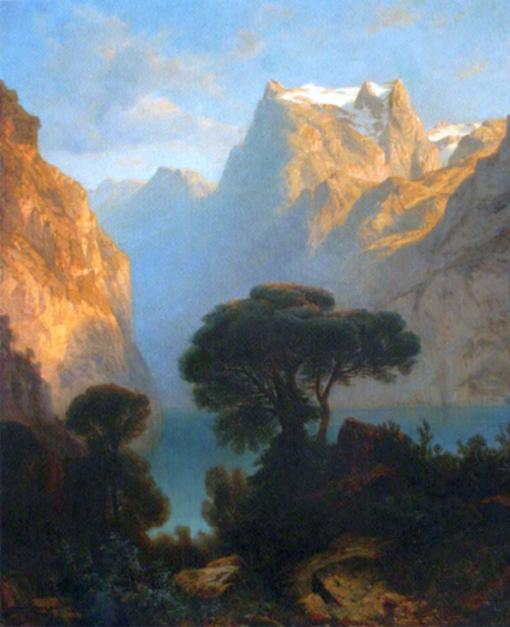
The Lake of the four Cantons (Lake Lucerne), c. 1850, National Museum, Warsaw

- Blick von Petit Saconnex auf Genf und den Montblanc, 1834, Leinwand, 31×44 cm. (Winterthur, Stiftung Oskar Reinhart)
- Die Tempelruinen von Paestum, 1847, Leinwand, 195×260 cm.(Leipzig, Museum of Art)
- Oak Trees. Philadelphia Museum of Art
