= Les Acacias =

District in Switzerland

Les Acacias is a district shared between the cities of Geneva and Carouge in Switzerland, located on the left bank of the Arve.

== Geography ==
In the past the area was frequently subjected to the overflow of the Arve, the Drize and the Aire rivers. The Acacias and Bâtie districts are the only ones in the city of Geneva located on the left bank of the Arve.

== History ==
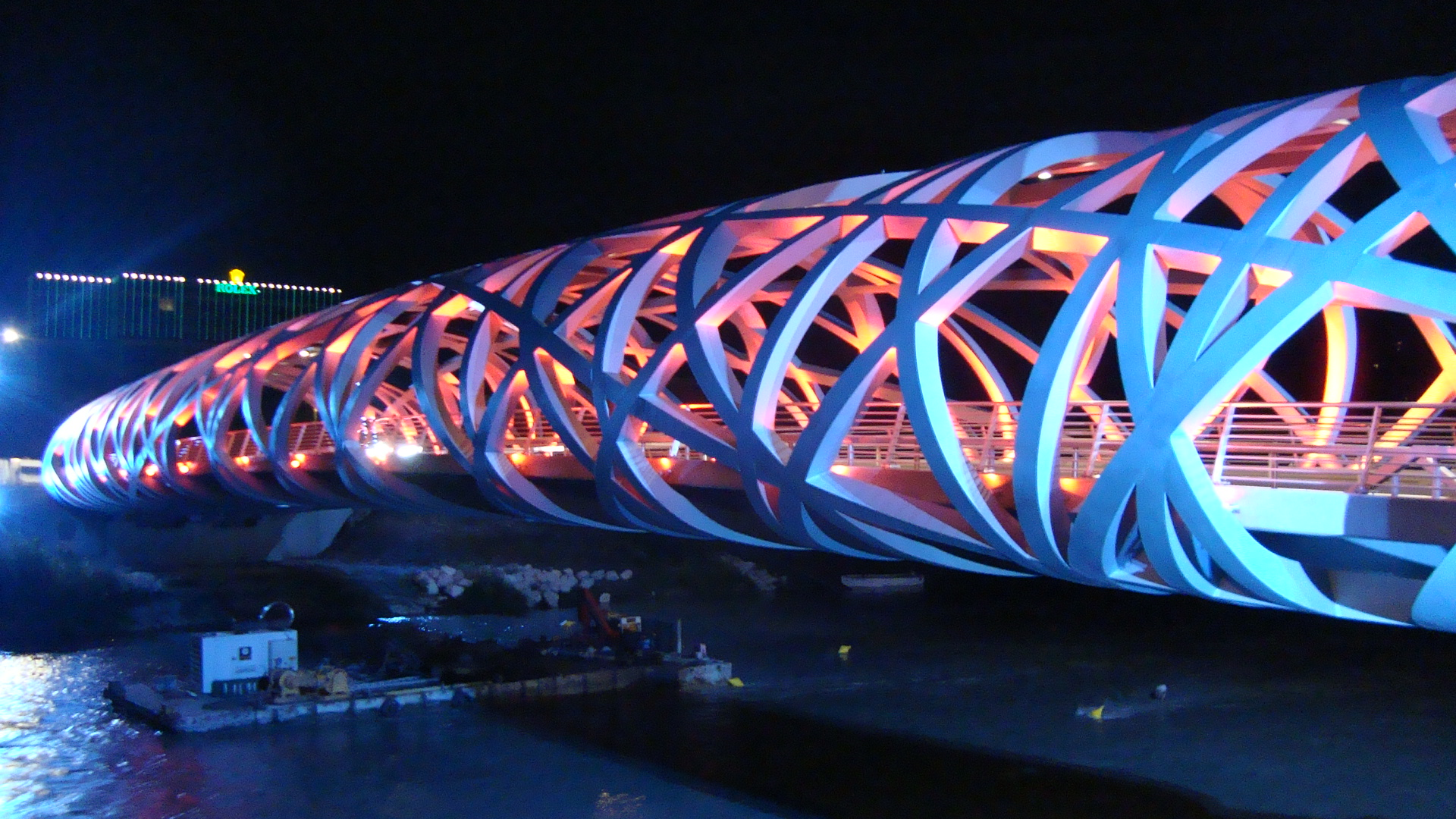
Hans-Wilsdorf bridge

The area, along with neighbouring La Praille, initially belonged to the lord of Lancy before moving under the lordship of La Bâtie-Meillé in 1347. This district was progressively developed from the Middle Ages onwards by sewage works, allowing market gardening activities on the Arve side and livestock breeding towards la Praille. The left bank, however, remained contested between then-independent Geneva and neighbouring Savoy until it came under Swiss jurisdiction in the middle of the 19th Century.

Exchanges with the city increased significantly from there onwards: a paved road is inaugurated in 1878 and streetcars start crossing the Arve in 1889. The Swiss Federal Railways and the canton bought land in 1919, and the construction of a commercial railroad station in La Praille led to major infrastructure work, including the canalization of the Drize and Aire rivers (1935).

The canton bought the land back from the SBB in 1950 to turn it into an industrial district. Companies rented plots for 90 years (surface rights). In just two years, 42 companies set up in Les Acacias. The district that was built was thus popular, artisanal and industrial.

The Vernets barracks were built in 1958, and a ice skating rink in 1959 that now hosts the Genève-Servette hockey team. Rolex set up its headquarters in 1965: the company, via the Hans-Wilsdorf Foundation would later come to build a replacement to the 1952 "temporary" Vernets footbridge, the iconic Hans-Wilsdorf Bridge (2012).

Geneva-based fire extinguisher company Sicli, founded in 1923, built its new manufacturing building at 45 route des Acacias in 1969. Known as the "Sicli Pavilion", it was acquired by the Canton in 2011 after the company's departure, and then registered in the Geneva inventory of historical monuments in 2012. As a cultural space, this place is now dedicated to architecture, construction and urban planning. The reinforced concrete shell roof rests on seven anchors, and is one of the most remarkable achievements of the engineer Heinz Isler.

The Acacias Park was created in 1979, on a former industrial site acquired by the City of Geneva. It was later renamed after social reformer Eglantyne Jebb.
