= Pierre-Louis De la Rive =

Swiss painter, engraver and designer

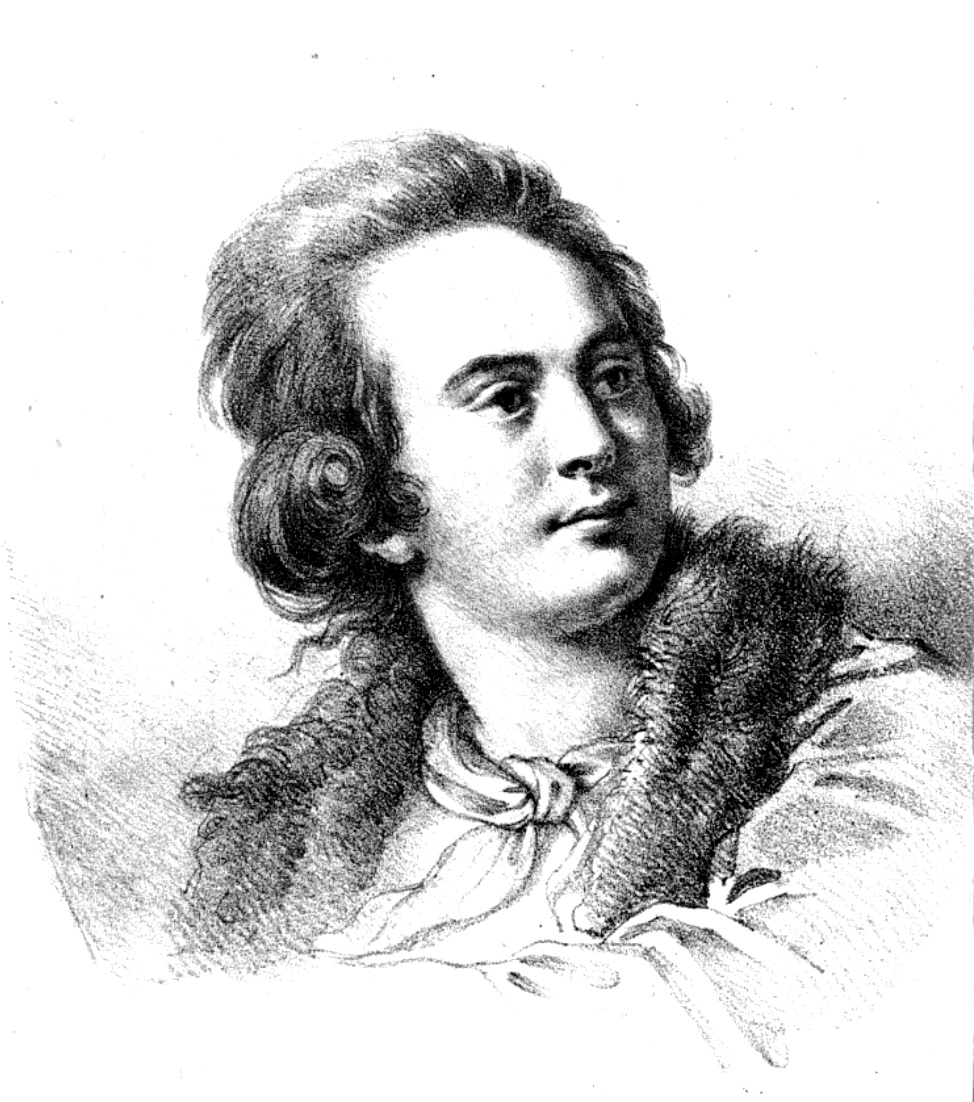
Self-portrait (before 1800)

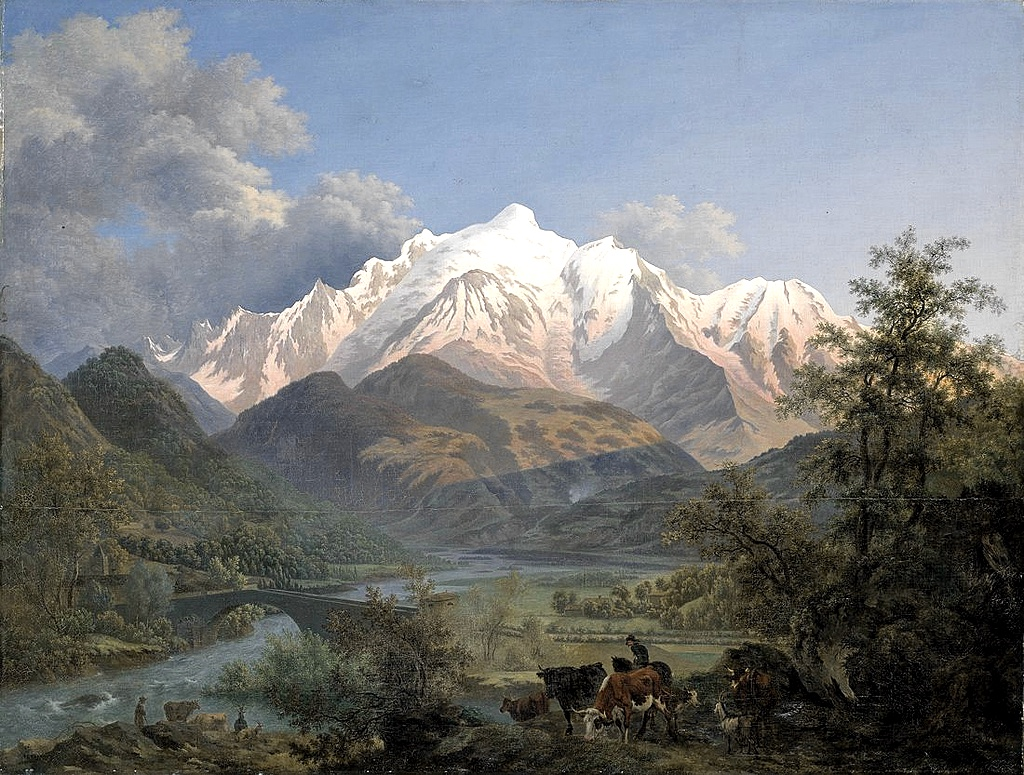
Mont-Blanc from Sallanches at Sunset (1802)

Pierre-Louis De la Rive (21 October 1753, Geneva - 7 October 1817, Presinge) was a Swiss painter, engraver and designer. His works helped originate the Geneva School of landscape painting and he was often referred to as the "inventor" of the Alpine landscape. He created the first painting of Mont Blanc from life in 1802.

== Biography ==
He was born to an old family of magistrates and learned men. His father, Pierre, was a pastor in Cartigny. In 1773, after attending courses in Natural Philosophy taught by Horace-Bénédict de Saussure, he gave up his legal studies but had great difficulty convincing his father to allow him to pursue a career in the fine arts. In 1774, he and his friend, Abraham-Louis-Rodolphe Ducros, travelled through Savoy and Vaud, making sketches.

Eventually, he was able to take lessons from the landscape painter, Nicolas Henri Joseph de Fassin, who came from Liège. His instruction consisted largely of copying the Dutch masters from the collections of François Tronchin and Jean-Jacques de Sellon.

In 1776, he went to Germany. After a brief stay in Mannheim, he enrolled at the Dresden Academy of Fine Arts, where he came under the tutelage of Giovanni Battista Casanova, who introduced him to the work of Claude Lorrain and the early Italians. In 1779, he married Théodora-Charlotte Godefroy and the couple returned to Geneva. Once there, he took Casanova's advice and began painting in a manner that would later be called en plein aire.

In 1784, he visited the major art collections in Holland, Germany and Austria. During an eighteen-month stay in Rome, he worked with Ducros, Jean-Pierre Saint-Ours and Giovanni Battista Canova, making copies in museums, painting outdoors and developing a less rigorous representational style.

Upon returning to Switzerland, in 1787, he settled in Céligny and became a member of the Geneva Art Society. He held major exhibitions at their salons of 1789 and 1792. As of 1788, he was also a member of the Council of Two Hundred. Following the War of the First Coalition, he was compelled to relocate to Bern, but was able to return in 1797 and settle in Presinge. He was even able to arrange exhibitions at the Salon of Paris in 1799 and 1801. His clients there included Germaine de Staël and Empress Joséphine.

In October, 1813, he had a paralytic stroke, from which he never fully recovered.
