= Wolfgang-Adam Töpffer =

Swiss painter

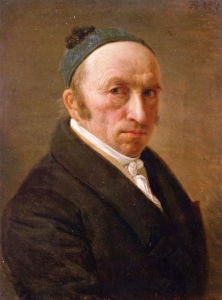
Self-portrait (1832)

Wolfgang-Adam Töpffer, also Adam-Wolfgang or simply Adam Töpffer (20 May 1766, Geneva – 10 August 1847, Geneva), was a Swiss painter who specialized in landscapes and watercolors. His son was the illustrator and cartoonist, Rodolphe Töpffer, who is sometimes called the "father of the comic book".

== Biography ==
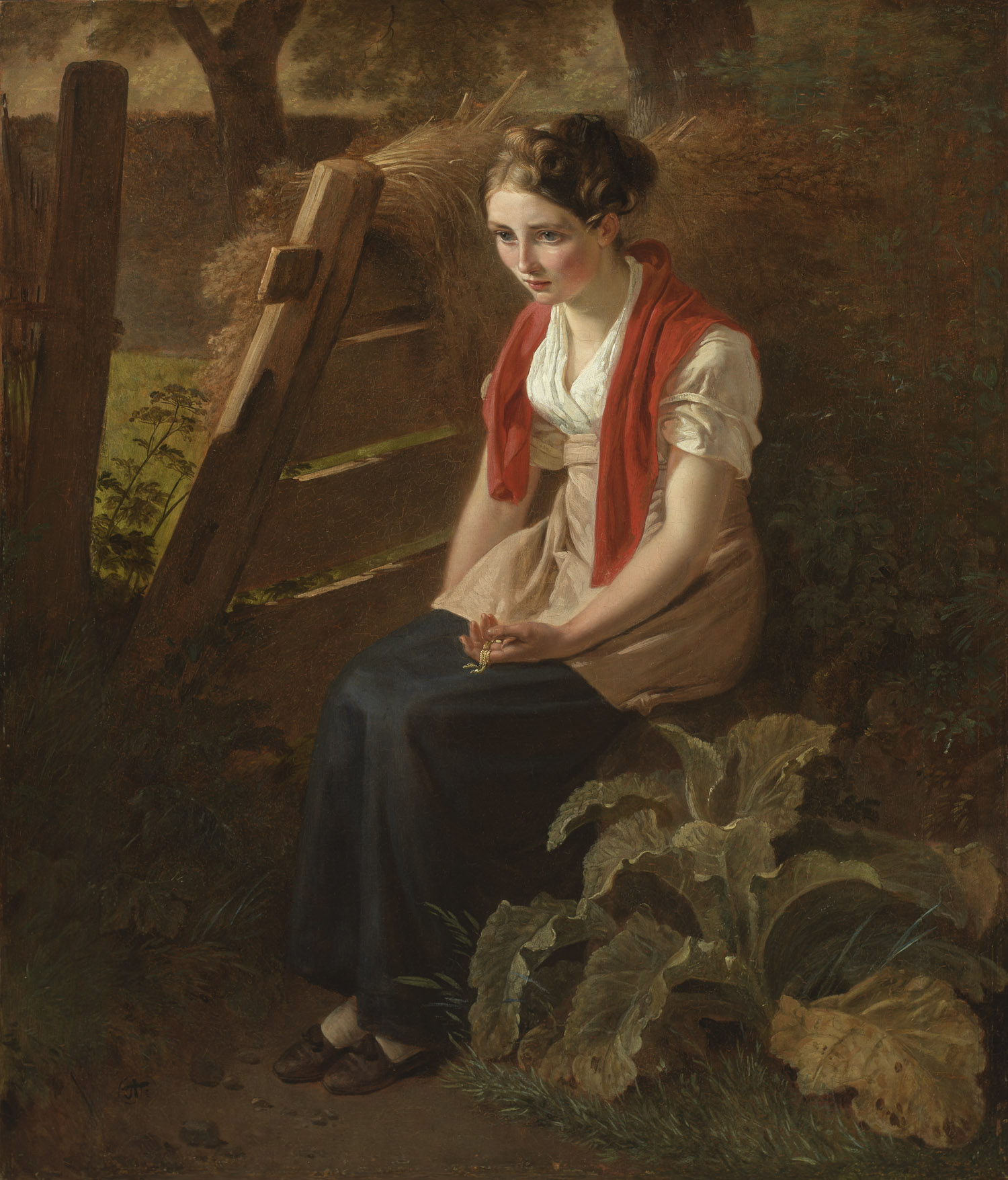
The Broken Necklace

He was the son of a German tailor from Schweinfurt, who had come to work in the Republic of Geneva for a few years, but decided to stay and become a citizen. After showing some talent for art, he was apprenticed to an engraver and later studied at the "Society of Arts'.

He worked as an engraver in Lausanne for a short time, then went on an Alpine expedition with Horace-Bénédict de Saussure; making sketches. In 1786, members of the Society, impressed with his work, recommended that he go to study in Paris and offered a scholarship. While there, he attended the École des Beaux-Arts, where he studied with Nicolas de Launay and learned watercolor technique from Jean-Thomas Thibault.

When he returned home in 1789, he found the city in turmoil from the effects of the French Revolution and was unable to find regular employment, so he did his best to make a living from teaching drawing and doing the occasional portrait. He held an exhibit of these in 1792, then accompanied the painter Pierre-Louis de La Rive on his travels, becoming interested in landscapes and what would later be called plein-air painting.

In the early years of the 19th Century, when the political situation had settled down a little, his works began to be successful, especially abroad. Some of his paintings were purchased by Empress Maria Feodorovna and the former Empress, Joséphine de Beauharnais. In 1812, he was awarded a gold medal at the Salon. He became a caricaturist and political cartoonist during the final years of the French Occupation and was sometimes called the "Hogarth of Geneva". For a time, some drawings from this period were mistakenly attributed to his son.

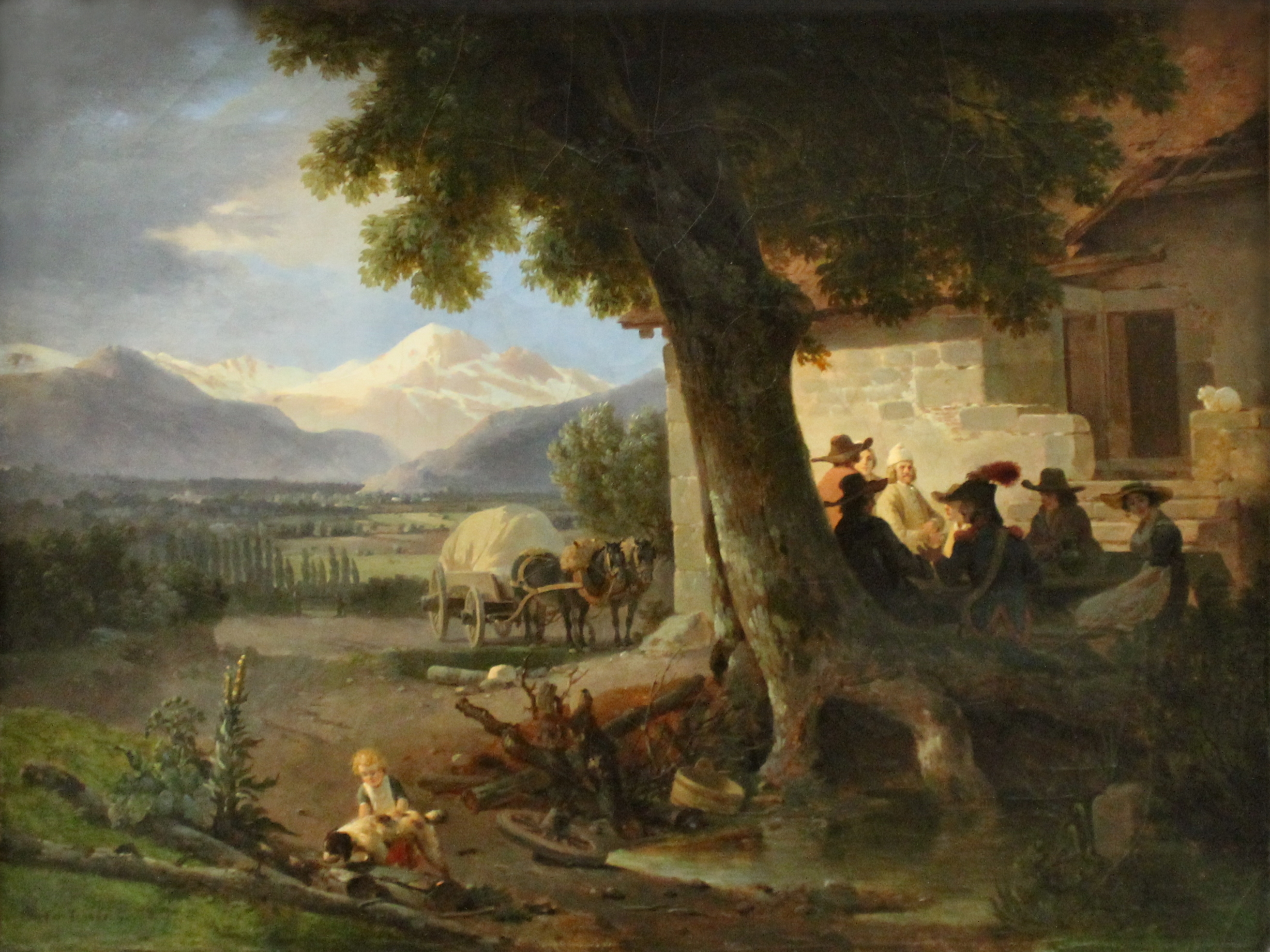
View of Mont Blanc from Geneva

He arranged for his daughter to marry a wealthy art collector and, after forty years of teaching and chairing the art society, died wealthy himself at the advanced age of 81, surviving his even more famous son by over a year.
