= Nicolas Henri Joseph de Fassin =

Dutch painter (1728–1811)

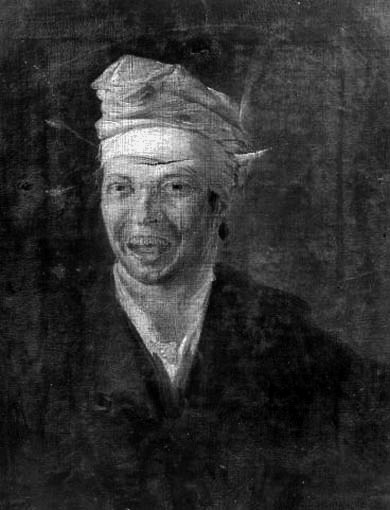
Self-portrait (ca. 1811)

Nicolas Henri Joseph de Fassin (20 April 1728 – 21 January 1811) was a landscape painter from Liège in the Southern Netherlands. Early in life he served in the French army, and it was not until he was thirty-four years of age that he commenced the study of art in the Academy at Antwerp. He afterwards visited Italy and Switzerland, and resided for some time at Geneva. He painted a landscape for Catherine the Great, for which he was handsomely rewarded, and many others are to be found at Liège, and in Germany and England. He died in his native city in 1811. His biography, with a list of his pictures, was published by Félix Alexandre Joseph Van Hulst in 1837.

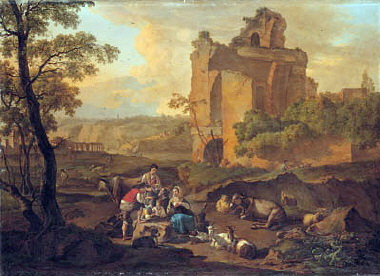
Italianate landscape with peasants resting

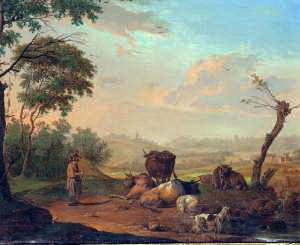
A shepherd and his herd near the water

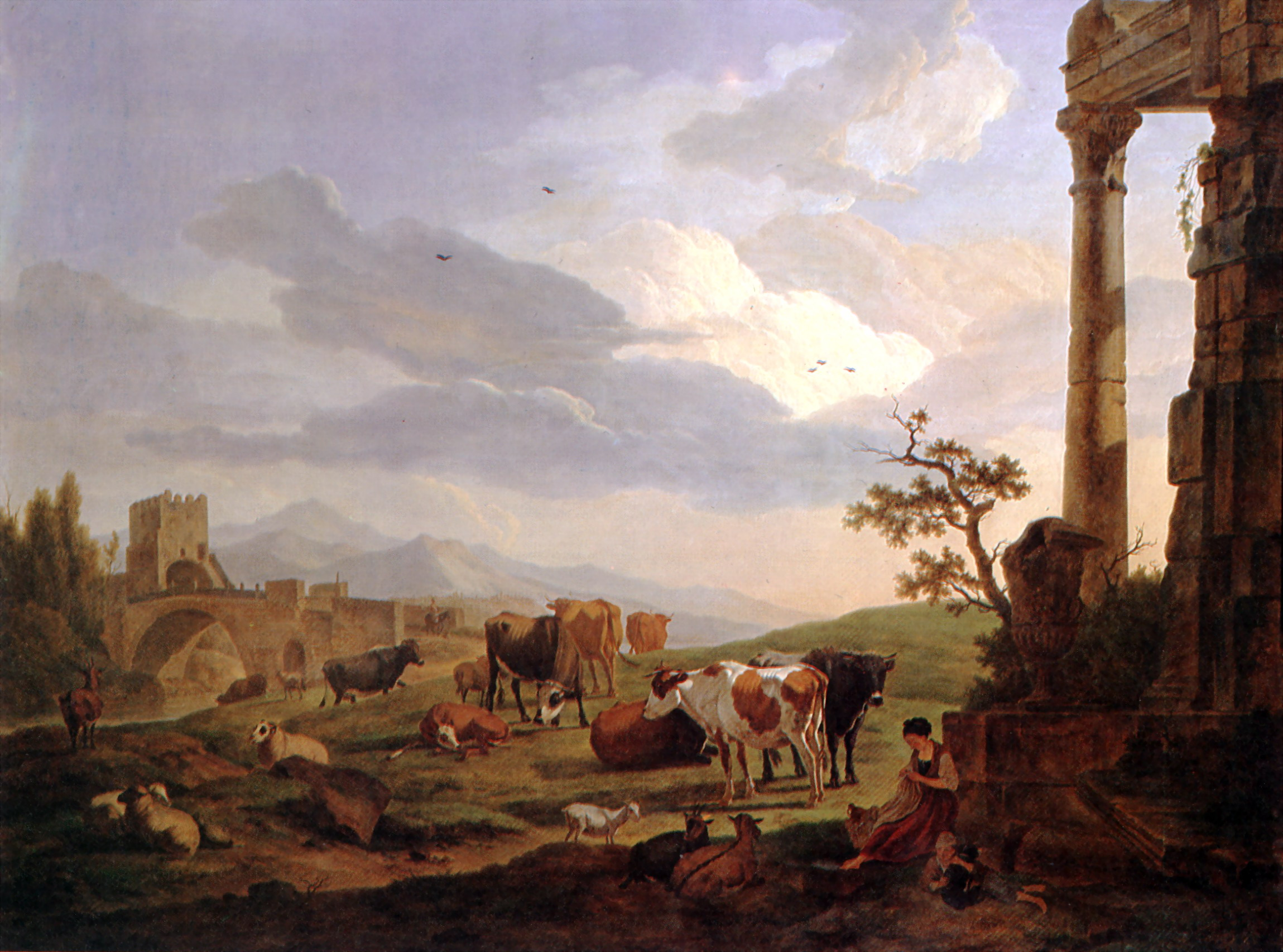
The morning

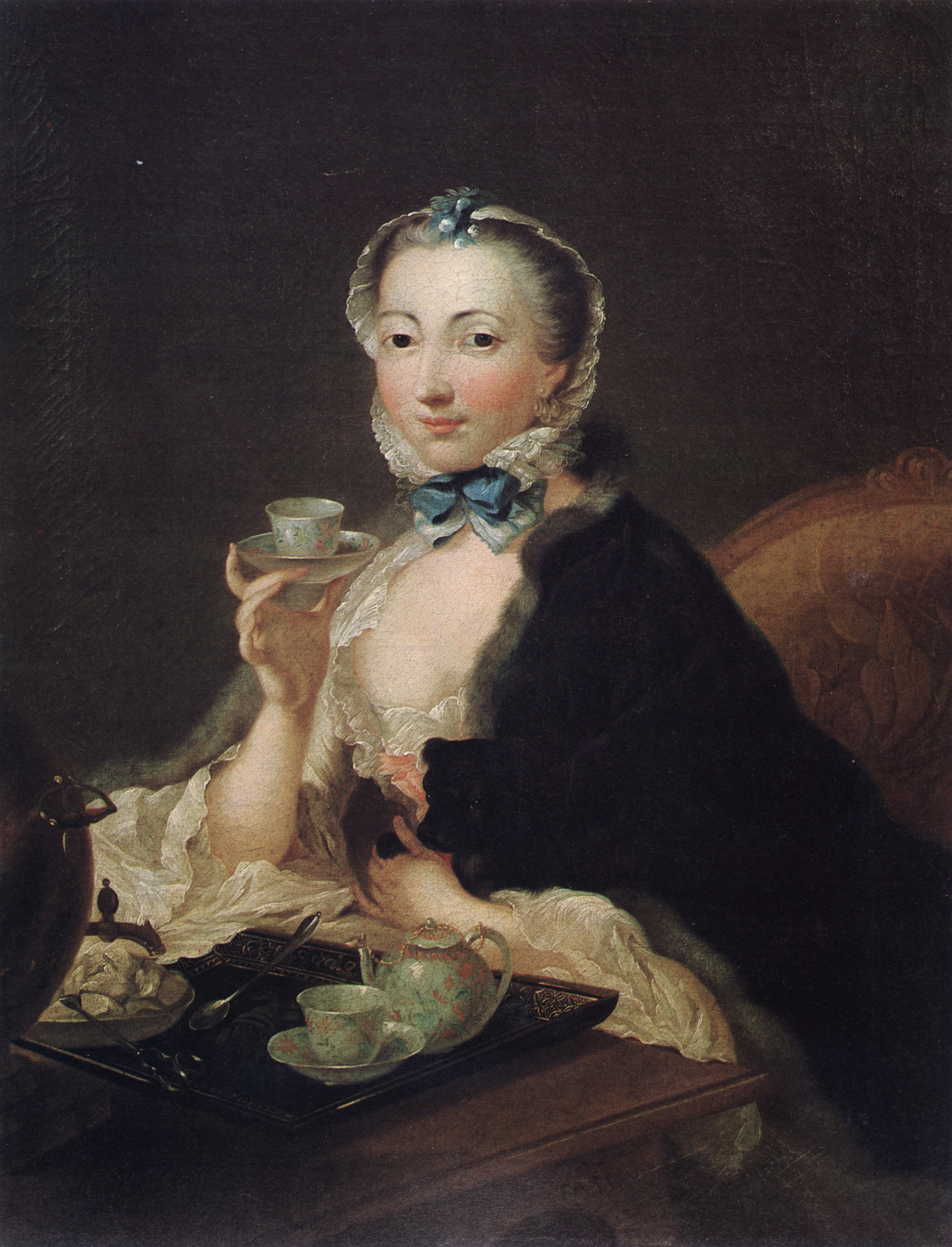
Woman drinking coffee
