= Hans Emmenegger (painter) =

Swiss painter (1866–1940)

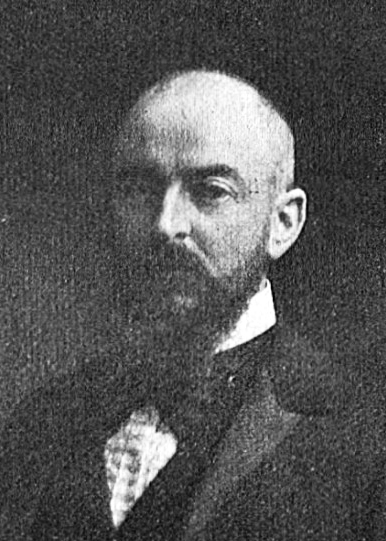
- Emmenegger in 1906
- Born: 19 August 1866; Küssnacht, Schwyz, Switzerland
- Died: 21 September 1940 (aged 74); Lucerne, Switzerland
- Occupation: Painter
- Parents: Johann Emmenegger (father); Maria Zimmermann (mother)

Hans Emmenegger (19 August 1866 – 21 September 1940) was a Swiss painter. He trained in Lucerne, Paris and Munich, and from the end of the 1890s took Arnold Böcklin as his model. He painted deserted, unspectacular places and took loneliness and melancholy as his themes. From 1915 he worked mainly on sequences of movement, which he depicted in kinetic pictures. He was also a respected collector of art and stamps.

== Biography ==
Hans Emmenegger was born on 19 August 1866 in Küssnacht in the canton of Schwyz, the son of Johann Emmenegger, a glass manufacturer, and Maria Zimmermann. He did not marry.

In 1883–1884 Emmenegger attended the school of applied arts (Kunstgewerbeschule) in Lucerne, then the Académie Julian in Paris and the studios of Gustave Boulanger, Jules Lefebvre and Jean-Léon Gérôme. In the winter of 1885–1886 he studied in Munich; he was a friend of Max Buri. From 1893 he lived at Herdschwand near Emmen, and he traveled widely.

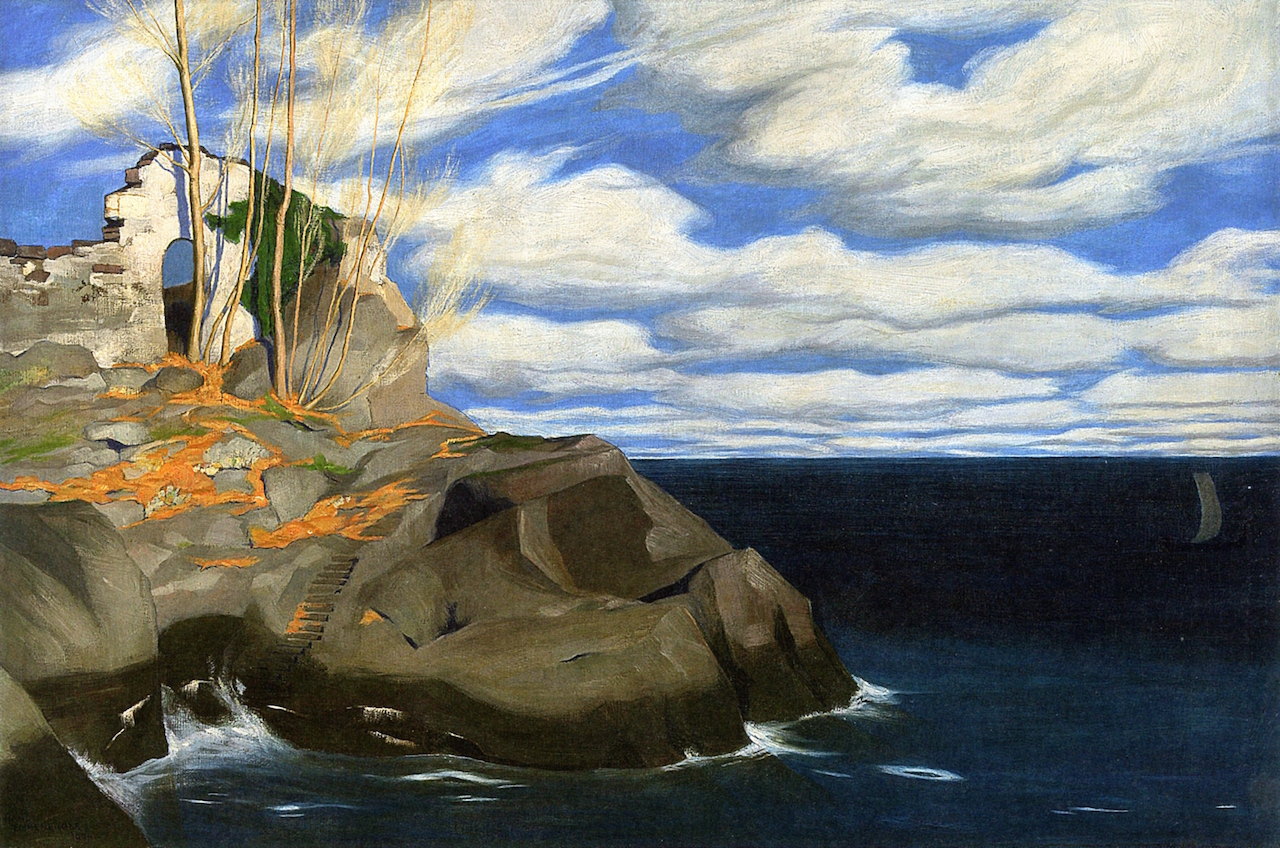
Einsames Ufer (Lonely shore), 1902

At the end of the 1890s Arnold Böcklin became Emmenegger's model. He painted deserted, unspectacular places and took loneliness and melancholy as his themes. In 1914–1915 he destroyed many of his pictures. From 1915 he worked mainly on sequences of movement, which he depicted in kinetic pictures (kinetische Bilder).

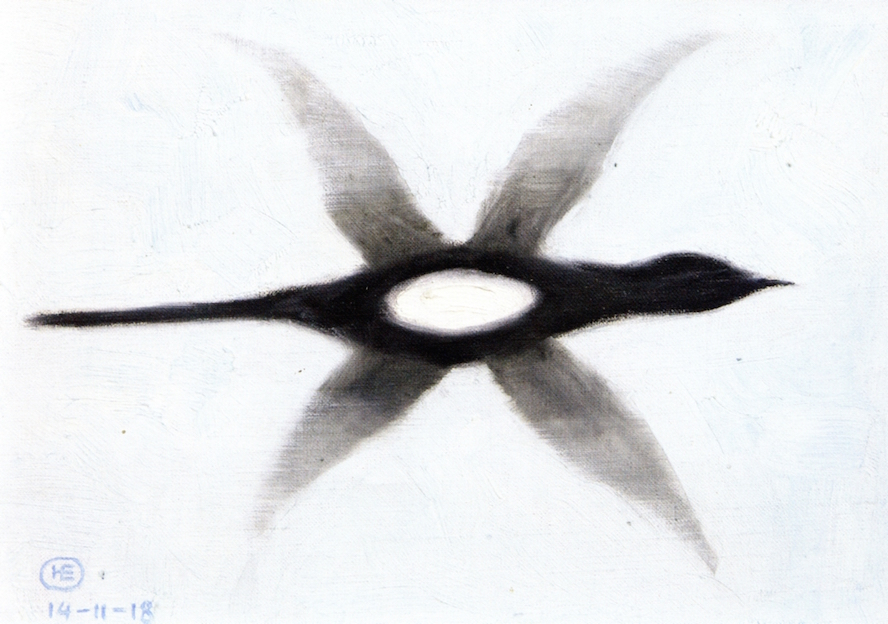
Magpie in flight, 1918

Emmenegger was a respected collector of art and of stamps. He practiced sports and kept up contacts with the artists' colony on Monte Verità. He was a co-founder of the Freie Vereinigung Gleichgesinnter (Free association of the like-minded) in 1901 and of the Lucerne section of the Swiss peace association (Schweizerischer Friedensverein). He had many friendships with artists, among them Cuno Amiet and Giovanni Giacometti. He died in Lucerne on 21 September 1940.

In 2021 the Fondation de l'Hermitage in Lausanne devoted a major retrospective to Emmenegger. In 2022 the Swiss Institute for Art Research (SIK-ISEA) in Zurich completed an art-technological research project on his notebook on painting technique (Maltechnik-Notizbuch), which he had kept between 1901 and 1905.

== Bibliography ==
- Biografisches Lexikon der Schweizer Kunst, 299 f.
