= Lists of women =

This is an index of lists about women.

== Arts ==
Below are lists related to women in fine art, dance and design.

- List of 20th-century women artists
- List of Algerian women artists
- List of Argentine women artists
- List of Armenian women artists
- List of Australian women artists
- List of Austrian women artists
- List of Azerbaijani women artists
- List of women architects
- List of women artists in the Armory Show
- List of Belgian women artists
- List of Bosnia and Herzegovina women artists
- List of Brazilian women artists
- List of Canadian women artists
- List of Chilean women artists
- List of Chinese women artists
- List of female comics creators
- List of feminist art critics
- List of Colombian women artists
- List of Croatian women artists
- List of Cuban women artists
- List of Czech women artists
- List of female dancers
- List of Danish women artists
- List of Dutch women artists
- List of Egyptian women artists
- List of Emirati women artists
- List of English women artists
- List of Estonian women artists
- List of Filipino women artists
- List of Finnish women artists
- List of French women artists
- List of German women artists
- List of Greek women artists
- List of Hungarian women artists
- List of Icelandic women artists
- List of Indian women artists
- List of Indian women in dance
- List of Iranian women artists
- List of Iraqi women artists
- List of Irish women artists
- List of Israeli women artists
- List of Italian women artists
- List of Jamaican women artists
- List of Japanese women artists
- List of Latvian women artists
- List of Lebanese women artists
- List of Lithuanian women artists
- List of female manga creators
- List of Macedonian women artists
- List of Mexican women artists
- List of Moroccan women artists
- List of New Zealand women artists
- List of Norwegian women artists
- List of Pakistani women artists
- List of Palestinian women artists
- List of women photographers
- List of Polish women artists
- List of Portuguese women artists
- List of prima ballerinas
- List of Romanian women artists
- List of Russian women artists
- List of female sculptors
- List of Scottish women artists
- List of Serbian women artists
- List of Slovak women artists
- List of Slovenian women artists
- List of South African women artists
- List of South Korean women artists
- List of Spanish women artists
- Women Surrealists
- List of Swedish women artists
- List of Swiss women artists
- List of Trinidad and Tobago women artists
- List of Turkish women artists
- List of Ukrainian women artists
- List of Uruguayan women artists
- List of Venezuelan women artists
- List of Welsh women artists
- List of women botanical illustrators

== Business ==
- Forbes list of The World's 100 Most Powerful Women
- List of female billionaires
- List of women company founders
- List of female top executives
- List of women book publishers
- List of women CEOs of Fortune 500 companies
- List of women in leadership
- List of women founders

== Technology ==
- List of women in technology
- List of women computer scientists
- List of women electronic literature writers
- List of women innovators and inventors by country

== Education ==
- List of female archivists
- List of female librarians

=== By alumni or faculty ===
- List of alumnae of women's colleges in the United States
- List of Barnard College people
- List of Mount Holyoke College people
- List of Old Collegians of PLC Melbourne
- List of Old Girls of PLC Sydney
- List of Radcliffe College people
- List of Wellesley College people

=== By student organizations ===
Below are lists related to notable women in sororities and similar student organizations.

- List of Alpha Kappa Alpha sisters
- List of Chi Omega sisters
- List of Delta Sigma Theta sisters
- List of Kappa Alpha Theta sisters
- List of Kappa Kappa Gamma sisters
- List of Pi Beta Phi sisters
- List of Zeta Phi Beta sisters

== Ethnic or national origin ==
Below are lists related to notable women based on ethnic or national origin.

- List of Albanian women
- List of Ghanaian women
- List of Sami women
- List of Native American women of the United States
- List of Roman women

=== Halls of fame ===
- Alabama Women's Hall of Fame
- Alaska Women's Hall of Fame
- Arizona Women's Hall of Fame
- Colorado Women's Hall of Fame
- Connecticut Women's Hall of Fame
- Florida Women's Hall of Fame
- Georgia Women of Achievement
- Hall of Fame of Delaware Women
- List of American heiresses
- Iowa Women's Hall of Fame
- Kentucky Women Remembered
- Louisiana Center for Women and Government Hall of Fame
- Maine Women's Hall of Fame
- Maryland Women's Hall of Fame
- Michigan Women's Hall of Fame
- National Women's Hall of Fame
- New Jersey Women's Hall of Fame
- Ohio Women's Hall of Fame
- Oklahoma Women's Hall of Fame
- Oregon Women of Achievement
- Texas Women's Hall of Fame
- Victorian Honour Roll of Women
- Women's Museum of Australia, formerly the National Pioneer Women's Hall of Fame

== Fictional characters ==
- List of Bond girls
- List of catgirls
- List of female action heroes
- List of female detective characters
- List of female stock characters
- List of female supervillains
- List of fictional gynoids
- List of fictional princesses
- List of fictional witches
- List of tomboys in fiction
- List of women warriors in folklore
- Maternal mortality in fiction

== Film and television ==
Below are lists related to notable women in film and television.

- List of female film and television directors
- List of female film directors
- List of female film score composers

=== Actresses ===
- Bollywood Movie Award – Best Female Debut
- List of American film actresses
- List of American television actresses
- List of Bengali actresses
- List of Chinese actresses
- List of Czech actresses
- List of Filipina actresses
- List of Indian film actresses
- List of Iranian actresses
- List of Italian actresses
- List of Japanese actresses
- List of Nepalese actresses
- List of nominees for the Academy Award for Best Supporting Actress (by actress)
- List of Thai actresses
- WAMPAS Baby Stars

=== Pornographic films ===
- AVN Award for Female Foreign Performer of the Year

== Gaming ==
- List of female chess players
- List of female role-playing game professionals

== History ==
- List of English royal mistresses
- List of females executed in the United States
- List of female explorers and travelers
- List of female Nobel laureates
- List of female philosophers
- List of feminists
- List of French royal mistresses
- List of Kentucky women in the civil rights era
- List of prostitutes and courtesans
- List of Scottish royal mistresses
- List of suffragists and suffragettes
- List of Swedish royal mistresses
- List of U.S. counties named after women
- List of women classicists
- List of women firsts
- List of women in the Heritage Floor
- List of women who led a revolt or rebellion
- List of women's rights activists
- Notable American Women, 1607–1950
- Women in piracy

== Human rights activists ==
- List of Women's International Democratic Federation people

== Leadership ==
- List of women in leadership

== Literature ==
- List of Albanian women writers
- List of Algerian women writers
- List of Argentine women writers
- List of Australian women writers
- List of Austrian women writers
- List of Azerbaijani women writers
- List of Bangladeshi women writers
- List of Belgian women writers
- List of Bolivian women writers
- List of Bosnia and Herzegovina women writers
- List of Brazilian women writers
- List of Bulgarian women writers
- List of Burkinabé women writers
- List of Canadian women writers in French
- List of Chilean women writers
- List of Chinese women writers
- List of Colombian women writers
- List of Croatian women writers
- List of Cuban women writers
- List of Czech women writers
- List of women cookbook writers
- List of Danish women writers
- List of Dutch women writers
- List of early-modern British women novelists
- List of early-modern British women playwrights
- List of early-modern British women poets
- List of ecofeminist authors
- List of Ecuadorian women writers
- List of Egyptian women writers
- List of Estonian women writers
- List of Faroese women writers
- List of female detective/mystery writers
- List of female linguists
- List of female poets
- List of female rhetoricians
- List of feminist poets
- List of Filipino women writers
- List of Finnish women writers
- List of French women writers
- List of German women writers
- List of Ghanaian women writers
- List of Greek women writers
- List of Guatemalan women writers
- List of Guyanese women writers
- List of Hungarian women writers
- List of Icelandic women writers
- List of Indian women writers
- List of Indonesian women writers
- List of Iranian women writers
- List of Irish women writers
- List of Italian women writers
- List of Ivorian women writers
- List of Jamaican women writers
- List of Japanese women writers
- List of Kenyan women writers
- List of Korean women writers
- List of Latvian women writers
- List of Lebanese women writers
- List of Luxembourg women writers
- List of Malaysian women writers
- List of Mexican women writers
- List of modernist women writers
- List of Moroccan women writers
- List of New Zealand women writers
- List of Nicaraguan women writers
- List of Nigerian women writers
- List of Norwegian women writers
- List of Pakistani women writers
- List of Palestinian women writers
- List of Panamanian women writers
- List of Paraguayan women writers
- List of Peruvian women writers
- List of Polish women writers
- List of Portuguese women writers
- List of Puerto Rican women writers
- List of Romanian women writers
- List of Russian women writers
- List of Senegalese women writers
- List of Serbian women writers
- List of Slovak women writers
- List of Slovenian women writers
- List of South African women writers
- List of Spanish women writers
- List of Swedish women writers
- List of Swiss women writers
- List of Trinidad and Tobago women writers
- List of Tunisian women writers
- List of Turkish women writers
- List of Ugandan women writers
- List of Ukrainian women writers
- List of Uruguayan women writers
- List of Welsh women writers
- List of women anthologists
- List of women warriors in folklore
- List of women writers
- List of women electronic literature writers
- Women letter writers
- List of Zimbabwean women writers

== Military ==
- List of female SOE agents
- List of WASP aviators
- Women's Royal Air Force List of Commandments and Directors

== Models and pageants ==
- FHM's 100 Sexiest Women (UK)
- Template:Top spot in the FHM Philippines "100 Sexiest Women"
- List of Allure cover models
- List of glamour models
- List of Japanese gravure idols
- List of The Price Is Right models
- List of Victoria's Secret models
- List of Vogue cover models

=== Pageants ===
- List of Miss America titleholders
- Miss America's Outstanding Teen
- Miss America award winners
- List of Miss USA titleholders
- List of Miss Teen USA titleholders
- List of Miss Universe titleholders
- Miss United States titleholders
- List of Miss World titleholders
- Miss World America titleholders
- List of Miss International titleholders
- Miss U.S. International titleholders
- List of Miss Earth titleholders
- Miss Earth United States titleholders
- Mrs. America titleholders
- Miss Teen America
- Miss Indian America
- Miss Hawaiian Tropic winners
- Miss LA Chinatown winners
- Miss Chinatown USA
- Miss Orlando
- Miss Teenage America
- National Sweetheart
- Queen of the Tournament of Roses, Rose Queens

=== Swimsuits and nudes ===
- List of Sports Illustrated Swimsuit Edition models
- List of Sports Illustrated Swimsuit Issue cover models
- List of Playboy models
- List of Playboy Playmates of the Month
- List of Playboy Playmates of the Year

== Music ==
Below are lists related to notable women in the music industry.

- Grammy Award for Best Female Rap Solo Performance
- List of all-female bands
- List of Australian women composers
- List of best-selling girl groups
- List of classic female blues singers
- List of female bass guitarists
- List of women composers
- List of women composers by birth year
- List of women composers by name
- List of women composers in the United States during the 20th century
- List of female film score composers
- List of female classical conductors
- List of female drummers
- List of female electronic musicians
- List of female heavy metal singers
- List of female rock singers
- List of female violinists
- List of women music publishers before 1900
- MTV Pilipinas for Favorite Female Video
- MTV Video Music Award for Best Female Video

=== By ethnic or national origin ===
- List of African-American women in classical music
- List of American female country singers
- List of Australian women composers
- List of Danish operatic sopranos
- List of Finnish operatic sopranos
- List of Norwegian operatic sopranos
- List of Swedish operatic sopranos
- List of women singers from Lebanon

=== By genre ===
- Grammy Award for Best Female Rap Solo Performance
- List of classic female blues singers
- List of female electronic musicians
- List of female heavy metal singers
- List of female rock singers
- List of riot grrrl bands

== Photography ==
Main list

- List of women photographers

By country

- List of American women photographers
- List of Australian women photographers
- List of Austrian women photographers
- List of British women photographers
- List of Canadian women photographers
- List of Chinese women photographers
- List of Danish women photographers
- List of Dutch women photographers
- List of French women photographers
- List of German women photographers
- List of Japanese women photographers
- List of Mexican women photographers
- List of New Zealand women photographers
- List of Spanish women photographers
- List of Swedish women photographers

== Politics ==
- List of 19th-century women politicians
- List of elected or appointed female deputy heads of government
- List of elected or appointed female deputy heads of state
- List of elected or appointed female heads of government
- List of elected or appointed female heads of state
- List of female rulers and title holders
- List of the first female holders of political offices
- List of the first female holders of political offices in Africa
- List of the first female holders of political offices in Asia
- List of the first female holders of political offices in Europe
- List of the first female holders of political offices in Oceania
- List of the first female holders of political offices in the Americas
- List of first female mayors
- List of queens regnant
- List of Valide Sultans

=== By country of origin ===
- Countess of Tripoli
- Duchess of Braganza
- Duchess of Courland
- Duchess of Teschen
- Japanese empresses
- List of Albanian consorts
- List of Armenian consorts
- List of Bohemian consorts
- List of Bosnian consorts
- List of Bulgarian consorts
- List of Chinese consorts
- List of consorts of Luxembourg
- List of consorts Malaysia
- List of consorts of the Muhammad Ali Dynasty
- List of consorts of Schleswig and Holstein
- List of Cypriot consorts
- List of Danish consorts
- List of female cabinet ministers of Chile
- List of female cabinet ministers of Iceland
- List of female cabinet ministers of Indonesia
- List of female cabinet ministers of Israel
- List of female cabinet ministers of Japan
- List of female cabinet ministers of Sri Lanka
- List of female cabinet ministers of Taiwan
- List of female cabinet ministers of Thailand
- List of female cabinet secretaries of the Philippines
- List of female Indian chief ministers
- List of female Indian governors
- List of Finnish consorts
- List of Georgian consorts
- List of Haitian consorts
- List of Hawaiian consorts
- List of Holy Roman Empresses
- List of Hungarian consorts
- List of Lithuanian consorts
- List of Monegasque consorts
- List of Montenegrin consorts
- List of Norwegian consorts
- List of Polish consorts
- List of princess-abbesses of Quedlinburg
- List of Roman and Byzantine Empresses
- List of Russian consorts
- List of Serbian consorts
- List of Swedish consorts
- List of Thai royal consorts
- List of Tongan consorts
- List of Visigothic queens
- Lists of female state governors
- Princess of Antioch
- Princess of Liechtenstein
- Princess of Taranto

==== Australia ====
- List of female cabinet ministers of Australia
- Women in the Australian House of Representatives
- Women in the Australian Senate
- Women in the New South Wales Legislative Assembly
- Women in the New South Wales Legislative Council
- Women in the Queensland Legislative Assembly
- Women in the South Australian House of Assembly
- Women in the South Australian Legislative Council
- Women in the Tasmanian House of Assembly
- Women in the Tasmanian Legislative Council
- Women in the Victorian Legislative Assembly
- Women in the Victorian Legislative Council
- Women in the Western Australian Legislative Assembly
- Women in the Western Australian Legislative Council

==== Austria ====
- List of Austrian consorts
- List of consorts of Lorraine
- List of Modenese consorts

==== Belgium ====
- Duchess of Brabant
- Duchess of Limburg
- List of Belgian consorts
- List of consorts of the counts of Flanders
- Princess of Ligne

==== Brazil ====
- List of Brazilian consorts
- List of female state governors in Brazil
- List of spouses of the presidents of Brazil
- Princess of Brazil

==== Canada ====
- List of Canadian monarchs
- List of consorts of Berg
- List of female first ministers in Canada
- List of female viceroys in Canada
- Women in Canadian provincial and territorial legislatures
- Women in the 39th Canadian Parliament
- Women in the 40th Canadian Parliament
- Women in the 41st Canadian Parliament

==== Chile ====
- List of female Chilean presidential candidates
- List of female cabinet ministers of Chile

==== France ====
- Countess of Artois
- Countess of Eu
- Duchess of Berry
- Countess of Dreux
- Countess of Évreux
- Countess of Foix
- Duchess of Longueville
- Duchess of Rohan-Rohan
- Duchess of Vendôme
- List of Angevin consorts
- List of Aquitanian consorts
- List of Burgundian consorts
- List of consorts of Alençon
- List of consorts of Bourbon
- List of consorts of Brittany
- List of consorts of Elbeuf
- List of consorts of Étampes
- List of consorts of Guise
- List of consorts of Lorraine
- List of consorts of Maine
- List of consorts of Montpensier
- List of consorts of Neuchâtel
- List of consorts of Nevers
- List of consorts of Orléans
- List of consorts of Provence
- List of French consorts
- List of Navarrese consorts
- List of Norman consorts
- List of spouses of the President of France
- List of Toulousain consorts
- Princess of Condé
- Princess of Conti
- Princess of Joinville
- Princess of Soubise
- Princess of Turenne

==== Germany ====
- Countess of Hainaut
- List of Aquitanian consorts
- List of Bavarian consorts
- List of consorts of Baden
- List of consorts of Brandenburg
- List of consorts of Bremen-Verden
- List of consorts of Brunswick-Lüneburg
- List of consorts of Cleves
- List of consorts of Holstein-Gottorp
- List of consorts of Holstein-Sonderburg
- List of consorts of Lippe
- List of consorts of Lorraine
- List of consorts of Mayenne
- List of consorts of Mecklenburg
- List of consorts of Neuchâtel
- List of consorts of Oldenburg
- List of consorts of Schleswig and Holstein
- List of consorts of Schwarzburg
- List of consorts of Thurn and Taxis
- List of consorts of Württemberg
- List of countesses of East Frisia
- List of Ferrarese consorts
- List of Frankish queens
- List of German queens
- List of Hanoverian consorts
- List of Hessian consorts
- List of Margravines of Meissen
- List of Modenese consorts
- List of Prussian consorts
- List of Rhenish consorts
- List of Saxon consorts
- List of Swabian consorts
- Princess of Leiningen

==== Greece ====
- List of exiled and pretending Byzantine Empresses
- List of Greek royal consorts
- Princess of Achaea

==== Ireland ====
- List of Irish queens and consorts
- List of female members of Dáil Éireann
- List of female members of Seanad Éireann

==== Italy ====
- Duchess of Aosta
- Duchess of Calabria
- Duchess of Galliera
- Duchess of Genoa
- List of consorts of Montferrat
- List of consorts of Montpellier
- List of consorts of Naples
- List of consorts of the Two Sicilies
- List of consorts of Tuscany
- List of countesses and duchesses of Urbino
- List of Ferrarese consorts
- List of Italian queens
- List of Mantuan consorts
- List of Milanese consorts
- List of Modenese consorts
- List of Parmese consorts
- List of Sardinian consorts
- List of Savoyard consorts
- List of Sicilian consorts
- Princess of Carignano
- Princess of Piedmont
- Wife of the President of the Italian Republic

==== Mexico ====
- List of female state governors in Mexico
- List of Mexican consorts

==== Netherlands ====
- Countess of Holland
- Duchess of Limburg
- List of consorts of the counts of Flanders
- List of Dutch consorts
- Princess of Orange

==== Portugal ====
- List of Portuguese consorts
- Princess of Portugal
- Princess Royal of Portugal

==== Romania ====
- List of consorts of Transylvania
- List of Romanian consorts

==== Spain ====
- List of Aragonese consorts
- List of Asturian consorts
- List of Castilian consorts
- List of Galician consorts
- List of Majorcan consorts
- List of Navarrese consorts
- List of Spanish consorts
- Princess of Asturias
- Princess of Girona

==== United Kingdom ====
- Blair Babe
- British princess
- British queens dowager
- English queens dowager
- List of British consorts
- List of dames commander of the Order of the British Empire
- List of English consorts
- List of Manx consorts
- List of Scottish consorts
- Princess Royal
- Princess of Wales
- Scottish queens dowager

==== United States ====
- First ladies of Puerto Rico
- List of California suffragists
- List of New Mexico suffragists
- List of Ohio suffragists
- List of Texas suffragists
- List of female governors in the United States
- List of female members of the House of Representatives of Puerto Rico
- List of female United States Cabinet members
- List of female United States presidential and vice presidential candidates
- List of the first women holders of political offices in the United States
- Women in the United States House of Representatives
- Women in the United States Senate

== Religion ==
- List of female mystics
- List of the first 32 women ordained as Church of England priests
- List of ordained Christian women
- List of women in the Bible
- List of women priests
- Women as theological figures
- List of the first women ordained as priests in the Anglican Church of Australia in 1992
- List of women bishops in the Anglican Church of Australia
- List of Christian women of the early church
- List of female Anglican bishops

== Science ==
- List of 21st-century women scientists
- List of African-American women in STEM fields
- List of Antarctic women (explorers and researchers)
- List of female astronauts
- List of female Egyptologists
- List of female Fellows of the Royal Society
- List of female scientists before the 20th century
- List of female scientists before the 21st century
- List of female scientists in the 20th century
- List of female mathematicians
- List of New Zealand women botanists
- List of women anthropologists
- List of women astronomers
- List of women botanists
- List of women climate scientists
- List of women in mathematics
- List of women neuroscientists

=== Astronomy ===
Astronomical objects named on a female theme:

- List of craters on Venus
- List of montes on Venus
- List of coronae on Venus

=== Health ===
- List of African-American women in medicine
- List of the verified oldest women
- List of women with ovarian cancer
- List of women who died in childbirth
- Pregnancy over age 50
- Pioneering women in medicine
- List of nurses
- List of Danish nurses

== Sports ==
- Alpine skiing World Cup women
- List of Australian athletics champions (Women)
- List of college women's lacrosse coaches with 250 wins
- List of college women's volleyball coaches with 700 wins
- List of European Athletics Championships medalists (women)
- List of female American football players
- Bangladesh women's national football team
- List of female bodybuilders
- List of female fitness & figure competitors
- List of female kickboxers
- List of female mixed martial artists
- List of Hungarian women's handball transfers summer 2011
- List of Olympic medalists in athletics (women)
- List of Olympic medalists in canoeing (women)
- List of Olympic medalists in fencing (women)
- List of Olympic medalists in gymnastics (women)
- List of Olympic medalists in handball (women)
- List of Olympic medalists in rowing (women)
- List of sportswomen
- List of World Championships in Athletics medalists (women)
- List of World Curling Women's champions

=== Badminton ===
- List of All England Women's Doubles champions
- List of All England Women's Singles champions
- List of Denmark Open Women's Singles champions
- List of Malaysia Open Women's Singles champions

=== Basketball ===
- List of college women's basketball coaches with 600 wins
- List of Connecticut Huskies women's basketball players with 1000 points
- List of Connecticut Huskies women's basketball players with 1000 rebounds
- List of current Women's National Basketball Association head coaches
- List of NCAA Division I women's basketball players with 1400 rebounds
- List of NCAA Division I women's basketball players with 3000 points
- List of WNBA career rebounding leaders
- List of WNBA career scoring leaders
- List of Women's Basketball Academic All-America Team Members of the Year
- List of Women's National Basketball Association players
- List of Women's National Basketball Association head coaches
- List of Women's National Basketball Association season assists leaders
- List of Women's National Basketball Association season rebounding leaders
- List of Women's National Basketball Association season scoring leaders

=== Boxing ===
- List of female boxers
- List of IBF female world champions
- List of WBA female world champions
- List of WBC female world champions
- List of WBO female world champions

=== Cricket ===
- Lists of women Test cricketers
- Lists of women One Day International cricketers
- Lists of women Twenty20 International cricketers
- List of women's Test cricket records
- List of women's One Day International cricket records
- List of women's Twenty20 International records
- List of centuries in women's Test cricket
- List of centuries in women's One Day International cricket
- List of centuries in women's Twenty20 International cricket
- List of players who have scored 1,000 or more runs in Women's Twenty20 International cricket
- List of women's Test cricketers who have taken five wickets on debut
- List of five-wicket hauls in women's One Day International cricket
- List of five-wicket hauls in women's Twenty20 International cricket
- List of women's international cricket hat-tricks

=== Cycling ===
- List of Olympic medalists in cycling (women)

=== Football ===
- African Women Footballer of the Year
- Diamantbollen
- International competitions in women's association football
- List of Austrian women's soccer teams
- List of Boston Breakers (WPS) players
- List of college women's soccer coaches with 250 wins
- List of England women's international footballers (alphabetical)
- List of FC Gold Pride players
- List of France women's international footballers
- List of French women's football champions
- List of German women's football champions
- List of women's national association football teams
- List of New Zealand women's international footballers
- List of Seattle Reign FC players
- List of Vancouver Whitecaps Women players
- List of women's association football clubs
- List of women's association football players with 100 or more international goals
- List of women's association football clubs in England
- List of women's football clubs in Brazil
- List of women's football clubs in Hong Kong
- List of women's football clubs in Japan
- List of women's football clubs in Scotland
- List of women's football clubs in South Korea
- List of women's football clubs in Spain
- List of women's football clubs in Sweden
- List of women's football clubs in Turkey

=== Golf ===
- Chronological list of LPGA major golf champions
- List of American Solheim Cup golfers
- List of du Maurier Classic champions
- List of female golfers
- List of golfers with most LPGA Tour wins
- List of Kraft Nabisco Championship champions
- List of LPGA Championship champions
- List of LPGA major championship winning golfers
- List of Titleholders Championship champions
- List of U.S. Women's Open (golf) champions
- List of Women's British Open champions
- List of Women's Western Open champions
- Women's World Golf Rankings

=== Ice hockey ===
- List of Canadian women's national ice hockey team rosters
- List of college women's ice hockey coaches with 250 wins
- List of IIHF Women's World Championship Directorate award winners
- List of Olympic women's ice hockey players for Canada
- List of Olympic women's ice hockey players for Finland
- List of Olympic women's ice hockey players for the United States
- List of United States women's national ice hockey team rosters

=== Racing ===
- List of female 24 Hours of Le Mans drivers
- List of female Formula One drivers
- List of female Indy 500 drivers
- List of female NASCAR drivers

=== Swimming ===
- List of European Aquatics Championships medalists in swimming (women)
- List of European Short Course Swimming Championships medalists (women)
- List of Maccabiah medalists in swimming (women)
- List of Olympic medalists in swimming (women)
- List of Swedish Short Course Swimming Championships champions (women)
- List of Swedish Swimming Championships champions (women)
- List of World Aquatics Championships medalists in swimming (women)

=== Tennis ===
- Chronological list of women's Grand Slam tennis champions
- List of Australian Open women's singles champions
- List of Australian Open women's doubles champions
- List of female tennis players
- List of French Open women's singles champions
- List of French Open women's doubles champions
- List of Grand Slam women's doubles champions
- List of Grand Slam women's singles champions
- List of open era Grand Slam women's singles finals
- List of US Open women's singles champions
- List of US Open women's doubles champions

=== Wrestling ===
- List of female freestyle wrestlers
- List of TNA Knockouts Champions
- List of WWE Divas Champions
- List of WWE Women's Champions
- List of women's wrestling promotions in the United States

== Other ==
- List of women's conferences
- List of women's organizations
