= Lists of women artists =

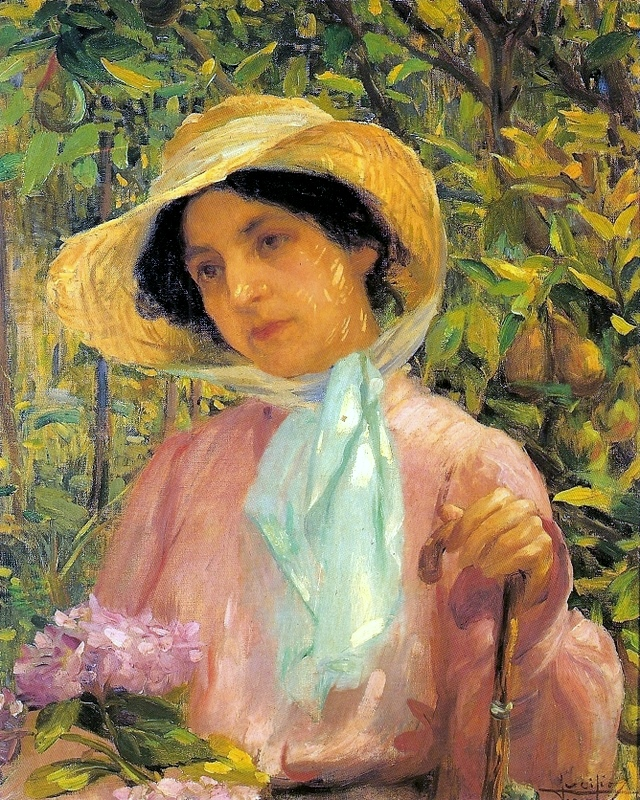
Georgina de Albuquerque by Lucílio de Albuquerque

Lists of women artists in the visual arts. Organized by country, by work and by other attributes.

== By country ==
- List of Algerian women artists
- List of American women artists
- List of Argentine women artists
- List of Armenian women artists
- List of Australian women artists
- List of Austrian women artists
- List of Belgian women artists
- List of Bosnia and Herzegovina women artists
- List of Brazilian women artists
- List of Canadian women artists
- List of Chilean women artists
- List of Chinese women artists
- List of Colombian women artists
- List of Croatian women artists
- List of Cuban women artists
- List of Czech women artists
- List of Danish women artists
- List of Dutch women artists
- List of Dutch women photographers
- List of Egyptian women artists
- List of English women artists
- List of Estonian women artists
- List of Filipino women artists
- List of Finnish women artists
- List of French women artists
- List of German women artists
- List of Hungarian women artists
- List of Icelandic women artists
- List of Indian women artists
- List of Iranian women artists
- List of Iraqi women artists
- List of Irish women artists
- List of Israeli women artists
- List of Italian women artists
- List of Jamaican women artists
- List of Japanese women artists
- List of Latvian women artists
- List of Lithuanian women artists
- List of Macedonian women artists
- List of Mexican women artists
- List of Moroccan women artists
- List of Norwegian women artists
- List of Pakistani women artists
- List of Polish women artists
- List of Portuguese women artists
- List of Romanian women artists
- List of Russian women artists
- List of Scottish women artists
- List of Serbian women artists
- List of Slovak women artists
- List of Slovenian women artists
- List of South African women artists
- List of South Korean women artists
- List of Spanish women artists
- List of Swedish women artists
- List of Swiss women artists
- List of Trinidad and Tobago women artists
- List of Turkish women artists
- List of Ukrainian women artists
- List of Venezuelan women artists
- List of Welsh women artists

== By medium ==
- List of female comics creators
- List of female film and television directors
- List of female sculptors
- List of women photographers
- List of women botanical illustrators

== By style ==
- List of women Impressionists
- Women surrealists
- List of women ukiyo-e and shin-hanga artists

== By exhibition ==
- List of women artists in the Armory Show
- List of women artists exhibited at the 1893 World's Columbian Exposition
- Women Artists: 1550–1950

== By book ==
- English Female Artists
- Great Women Masters of Art
- Women Painters of the World

== By time period ==
- List of 16th-century women artists
  - List of Italian Renaissance female artists
- List of 17th-century women artists
- List of 18th-century women artists
- List of 19th-century women artists
- List of 20th-century women artists
- List of 21st-century women artists

== Other ==
- List of Native American women artists

== See also ==
- Ad Hoc Committee of Women Artists
- Advancing Women Artists Foundation
- Clara database
- Dictionary of Women Artists
- Feminist art criticism
- Incheon Women Artists' Biennale
- List of feminist artists
- List of women in the Heritage Floor
- National Association of Women Artists
- Society of Women Artists
- The Story of Women and Art
- Women Artists News
- Women Artists Visibility Event
- Women Eco Artists Dialog
- Women in the art history field
- Women Painting Women
- !Women Art Revolution
