= Valerie Brathwaite =

Valerie Brathwaite (c. 1938 – July 6, 2026) was a Venezuela-based Trinidadian artist. Born in Trinidad and Tobago and educated in Europe, she settled in 1969 in Caracas, where she worked extensively in sculpture and drawing. Her work is characterized by its colorful reflection of Caribbean landscapes, flora, and fauna.

== Early life and education ==
Valerie Brathwaite was born in San Fernando, Trinidad and Tobago, in 1938 (although some sources indicate 1940.) Her father was a civil servant who was involved in the country's transition to independence.

In the 1950s, she studied art and interior design in London, both at the Hornsey College of Art and the Royal College of Art. The sculptor Hubert Dalwood was an influential instructor for her in this period. Then, from 1959 to 1964, she was trained at Paris' École des Beaux-Arts, where she studied under the sculptor Ossip Zadkine. Later on, in 1978 and 1979, she would further her studies at the Royal Swedish Academy of Fine Arts.

In the mid-1960s, Brathwaite returned to Trinidad for a few years. Then, in 1969, on the encouragement of the Venezuelan artist Gego, she moved to Caracas, which became her longtime home. She would gain Venezuelan citizenship in 1989.

== Career ==
Brathwaite's brightly colored art was inspired by Caribbean landscapes and ecosystems, with her sculptures often reflecting organic forms. Early in her career, her use of color was viewed as subversive. While her interest in natural forms was a through-line of her career, the materials she employed varied widely.

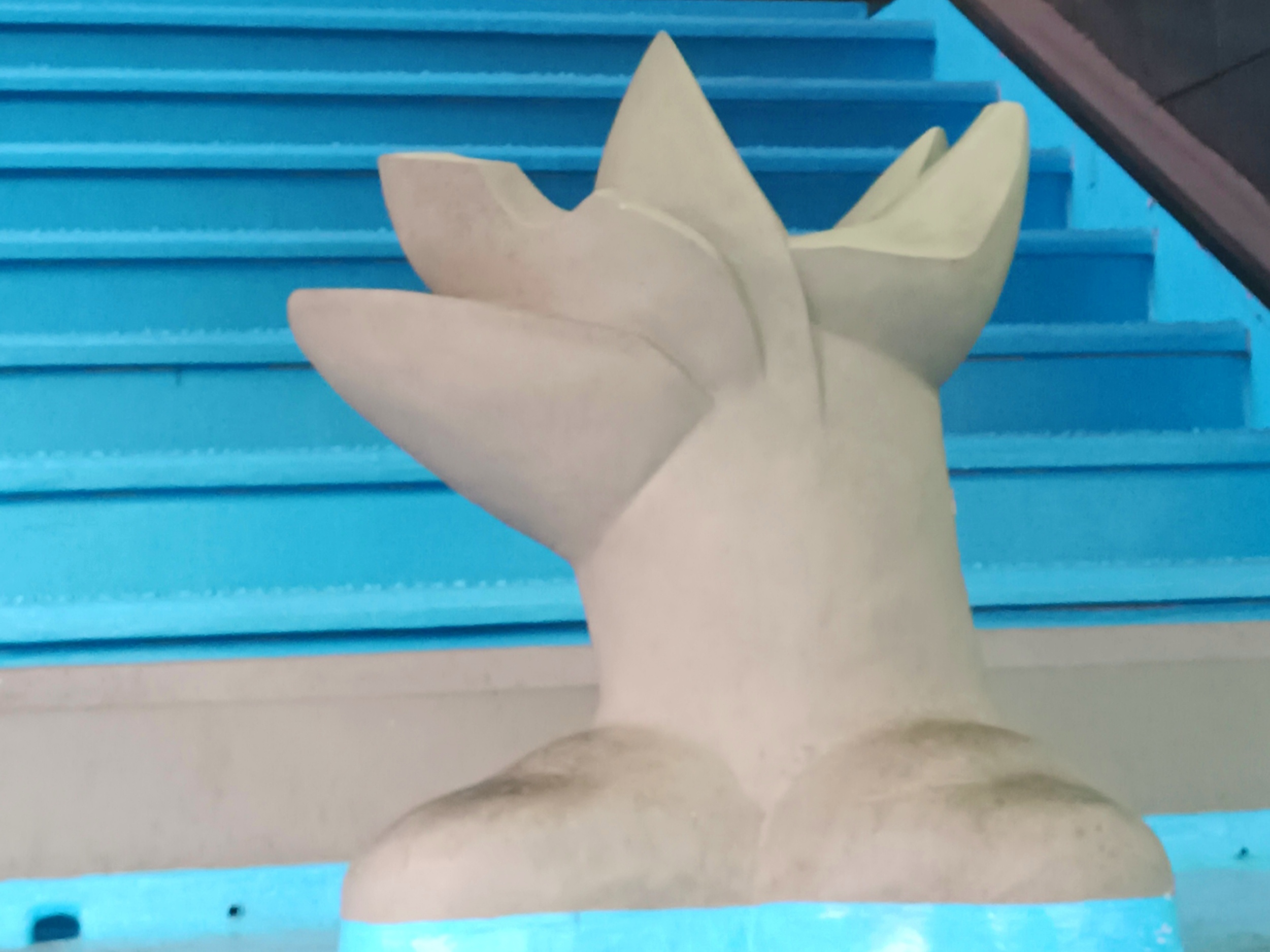
A sculpture from Brathwaite's Dancing Vegetables series

In the 1970s, her practice focused on plaster and clay sculpture, as well as drawing. Her first solo exhibition, Valerie Brathwaite: Esculturas, at Caracas' Museo de Bellas Artes in 1975, featured low, horizontal sculptures inspired by the flow of lava.

The following decade, she turned to print and collage, while continuing to pursue sculpture in such works as her Dancing Vegetables series. In the 1990s, she began employing ceramic and fabric in her sculptures, as in her 2002 Fingerprints of the Dance series that involved a performance in which she imprinted her body onto plates made of ceramic. In 2004, she turned to concrete. Then, in her final years, she began carving reliefs out of medium-density fibreboard.

While primarily known in Venezuela for most of her career, she began to gain international recognition in her later years, with gallery exhibitions in New York in the early 2020s. The Guggenheim Museum has acquired work from her Soft Series.

In 2025, MALBA exhibited a retrospective of Brathwaite's work under the title A Flowing Path of Her Own.

The artist also had an interest in music, performing as an Afro jazz DJ beginning in the 1990s, including at a 2024 art fair at the Museo Reina Sofía.

== Death and legacy ==
Brathwaite died in 2026 at her home and studio in Caracas. On her death, she was described as "one of Venezuela's most celebrated artists of the late twentieth and early twenty-first centuries."
