= List of female freestyle wrestlers =

This is a list of female freestyle wrestlers, in alphabetical order.

- Alina Filipovych
- Heaven Fitch
- Anna Gomis
- Kyoko Hamaguchi
- Chiharu Icho
- Kaori Icho
- Lise Legrand
- Gouzel Maniourova
- Sara McMann
- Irini Merleni
- Randi Miller
- Patricia Miranda
- Tonya Verbeek
- Saori Yoshida
- Sarita Mor
- Wang Xu
