= List of Trinidad and Tobago women artists =

This is a list of women artists who were born in Trinidad and Tobago or whose artworks are closely associated with that country.

== A ==
- Sybil Atteck (1911–1975), pioneering Trinidadian woman painter
- Nicole Awai (born 1966), multimedia artist, currently residing and working in Austin, Texas.

== B ==
- Valerie Brathwaite (c. 1938–2026), sculpture
- Cheryl Byron (c. 1947–2003), visual artist

== C ==
- Vera Cudjoe (born 1928), actress, producer, and educator; founder of Black Theatre Canada

== L ==
- Amy Leong Pang (1908–1989), painter

== M ==
- Althea McNish (c. 1933–2020), textile designer

== N ==
- Wendy Nanan (born 1955), painter and sculptor

== S ==
- Roberta Silva (born 1971), sculptor, installation artist; now in Italy

== See also ==
- Culture of Trinidad and Tobago
- List of Tobagonians
- List of Trinidadians
- Lists of women artists
