= List of alumnae of women's colleges in the United States =

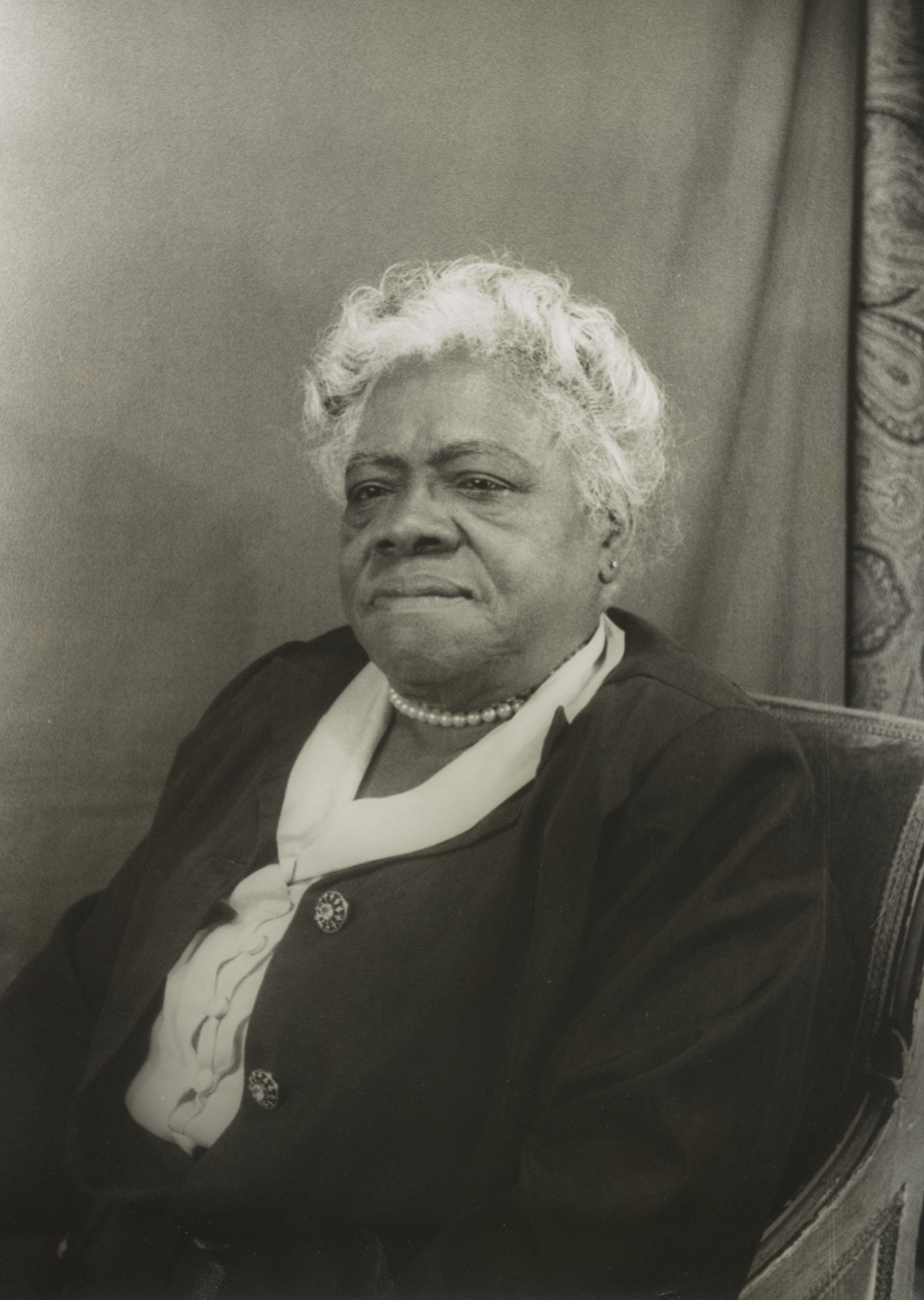
Mary McLeod Bethune (Scotia Seminary)

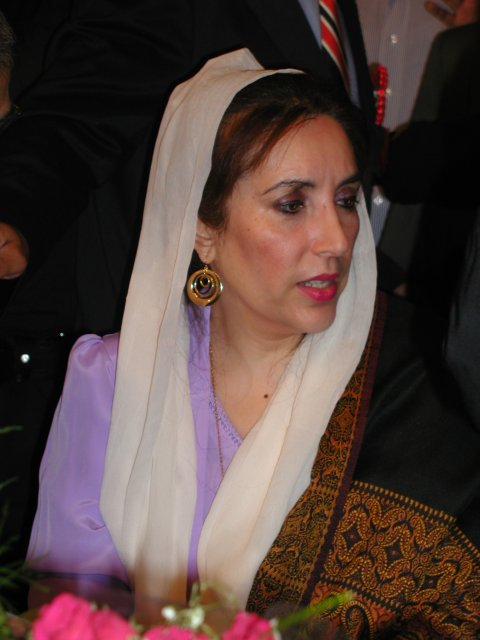
Benazir Bhutto (Radcliffe College)

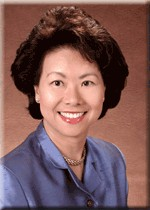
Elaine Chao (Mount Holyoke College)

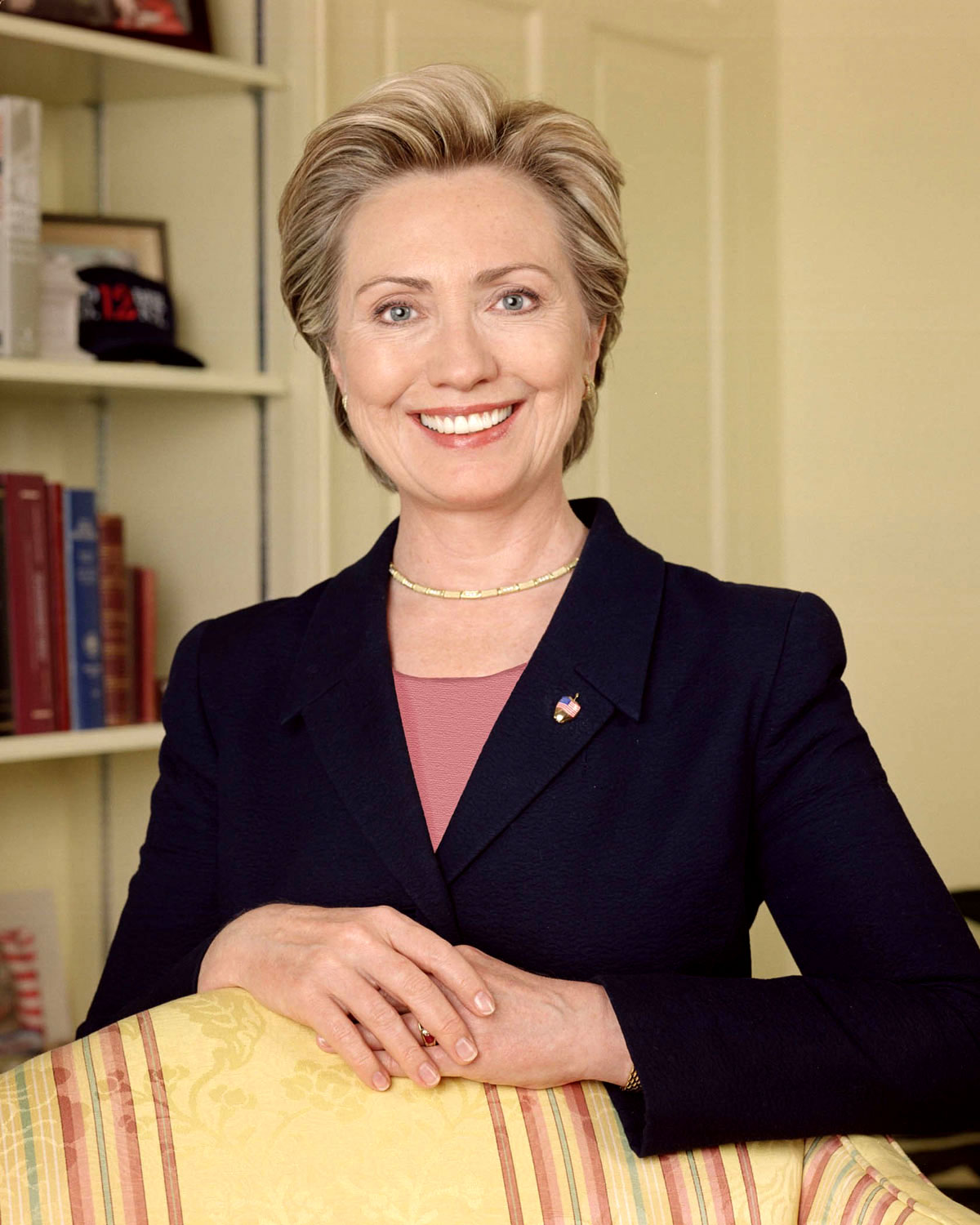
Hillary Clinton (Wellesley College)

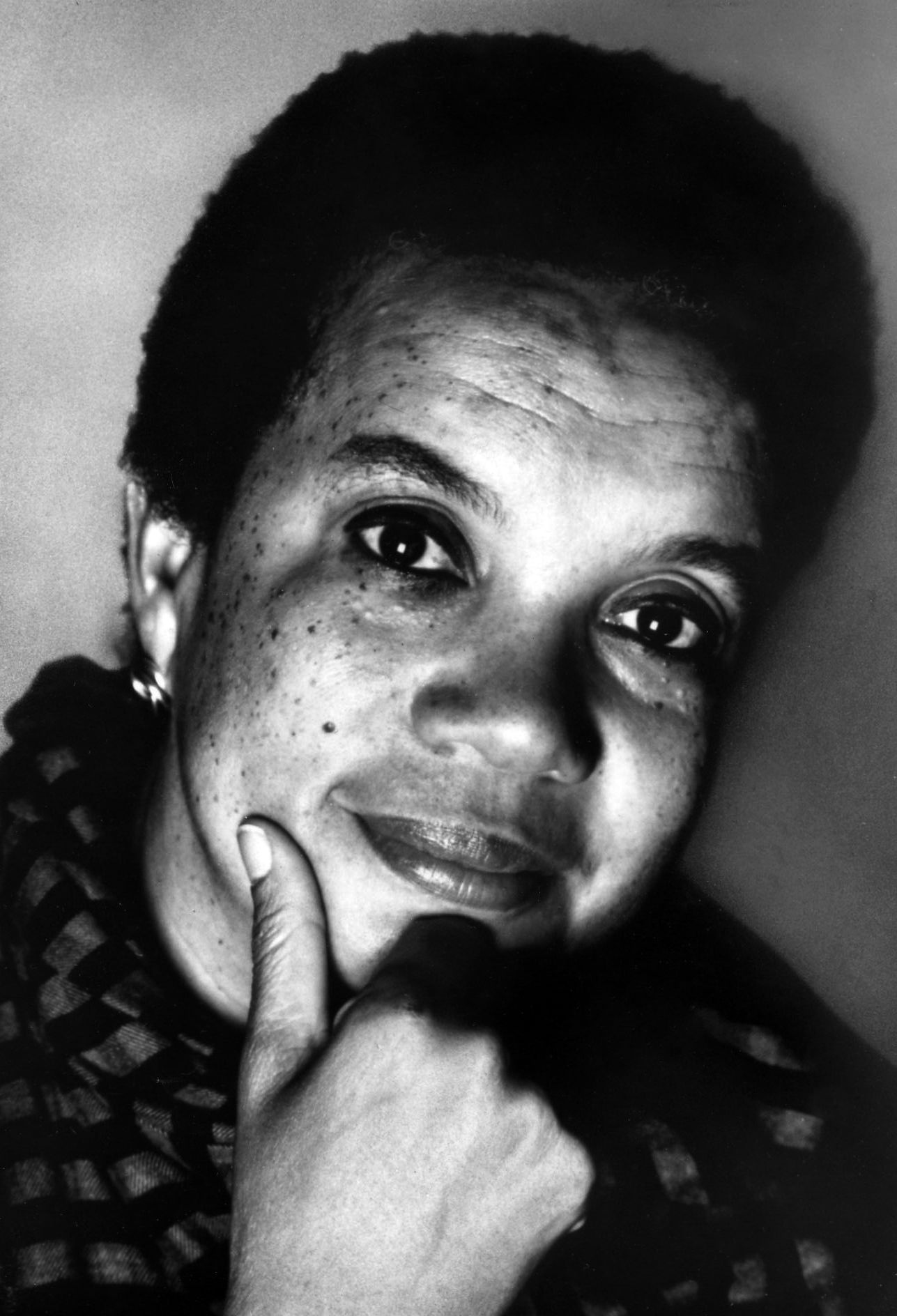
Marian Wright Edelman (Spelman College; from the CDC Public Health Image Library)

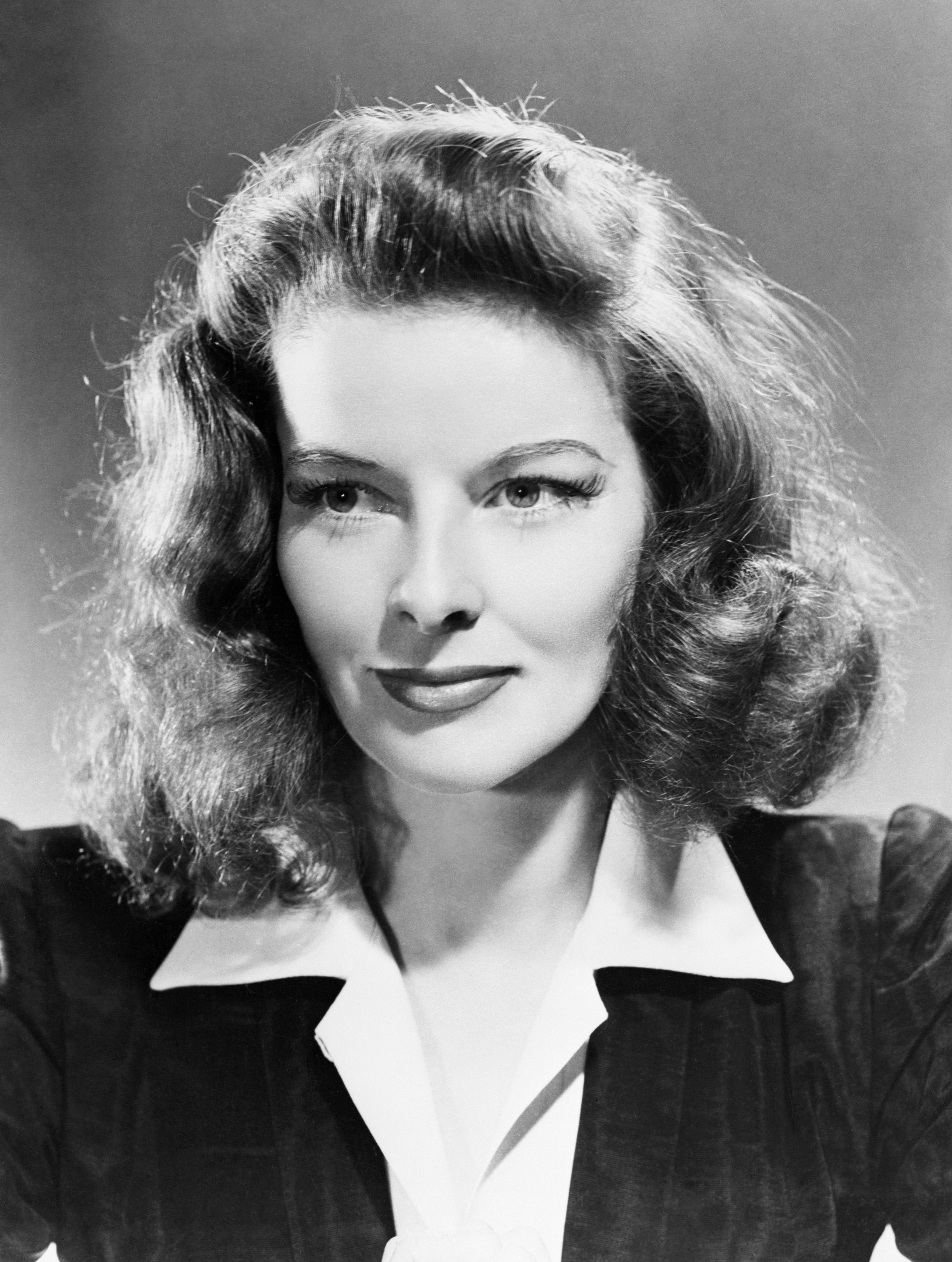
Katharine Hepburn (Bryn Mawr College)

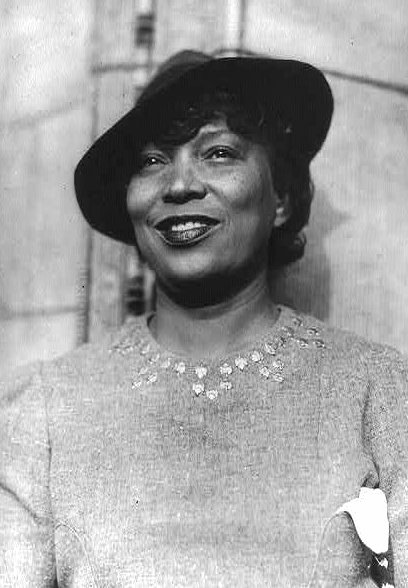
Zora Neale Hurston (Barnard College)

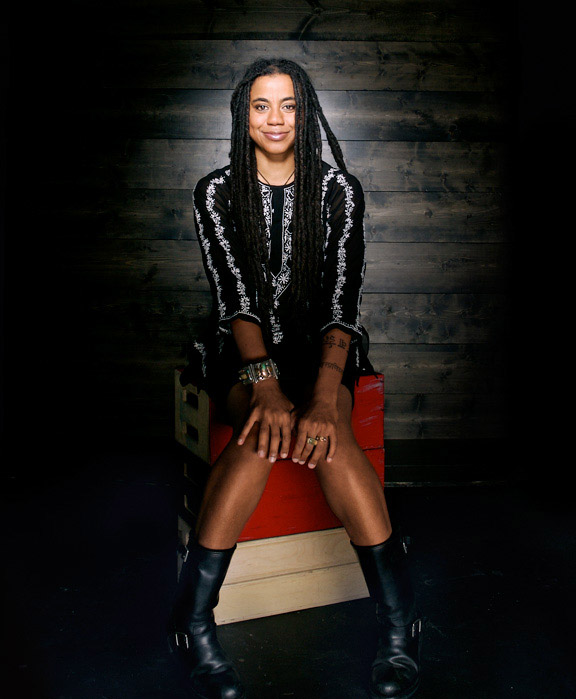
Suzan-Lori Parks (Mount Holyoke College)

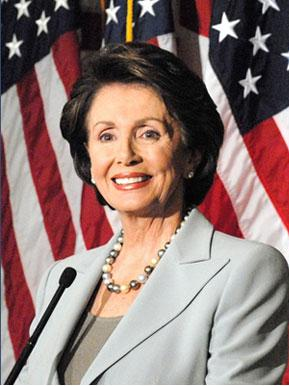
Nancy Pelosi (Trinity College)

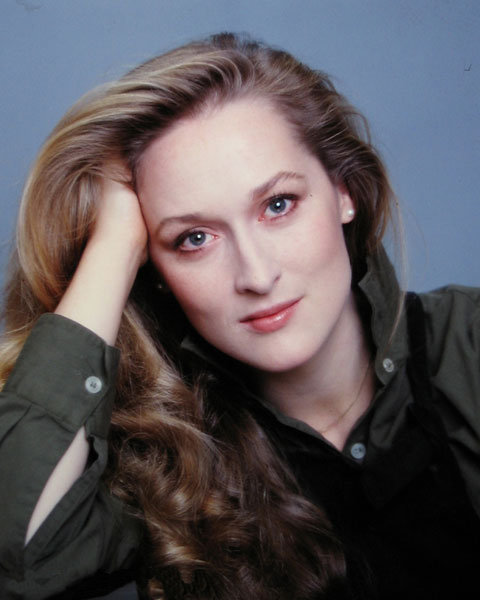
Meryl Streep (Vassar College)

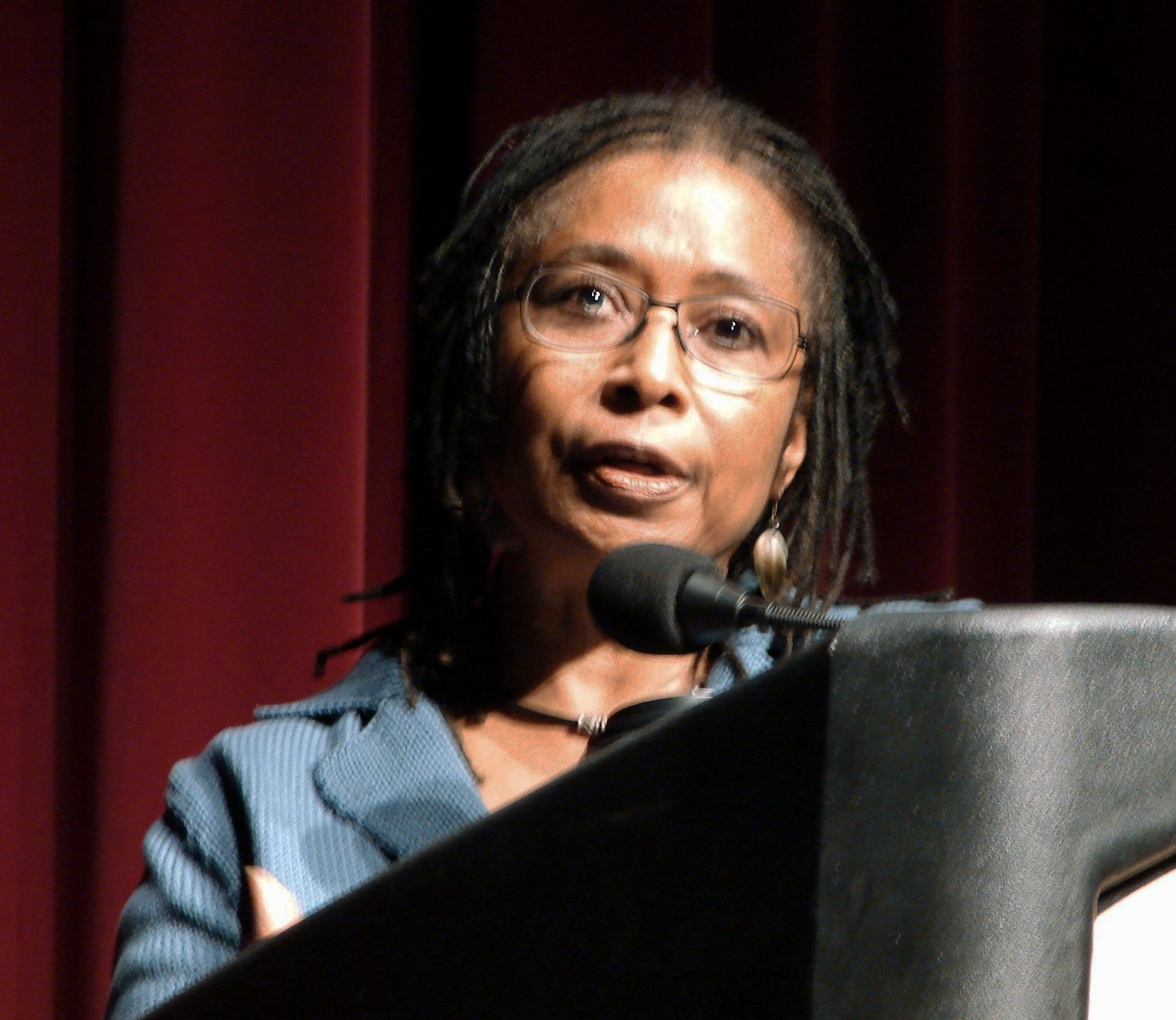
Alice Walker (Spelman College and Sarah Lawrence College)

The following is a list of individuals associated with women's colleges in the United States through attending as a student or graduating.

== Activists ==
- Marian Wright Edelman, graduate of Spelman College; activist for the rights of children; president and founder of the Children's Defense Fund
- Betty Friedan, 1942 graduate of Smith College; author and noted feminist
- Sally Miller Gearhart, 1952 graduate of Sweet Briar College; feminist, science fiction author and activist
- Gloria Johnson-Powell, graduate of Mount Holyoke College; important figure in the American Civil Rights Movement; one of the first African-American women to attain tenure at Harvard Medical School
- Gloria Steinem, 1956 graduate of Smith College
- Silda Wall Spitzer, 1980 graduate of Meredith College; founder and chair of the board of community/volunteering group Children for Children

== Authors, journalists, and poets ==
- Margaret Atwood, graduate of Radcliffe College; author
- Katharine Lee Bates, graduate of Wellesley College; best known for writing "America the Beautiful"
- Elizabeth Bishop, graduate of Vassar College; Poet Laureate of the United States, 1949–1950; Pulitzer Prize winner in 1956
- Madeleine Blais, 1969 graduate of the College of New Rochelle; Pulitzer Prize–winning journalist and author
- Margaret Wise Brown, 1932 graduate of Hollins University; author of Goodnight Moon
- Pearl Sydenstricker Buck, 1914 graduate of Randolph-Macon Woman's College; author of The Good Earth; first woman to win both the Nobel and Pulitzer prizes
- Elizabeth Campbell, 1923 graduate of Salem College; first female founder of a PBS station
- Pearl Cleage, graduate of Spelman College; author
- Ann Compton, graduate of Hollins University; news reporter for ABC; inductee of the Radio Hall of Fame
- Candy Crowley, 1970 graduate of Randolph-Macon Woman's College; former CNN senior political correspondent; recipient of awards for outstanding journalism from the National Press Foundation and the Associated Press
- Kiran Desai, graduate of Hollins University; author; recipient of the Man Booker Prize in 2006
- Emily Dickinson, attended Mount Holyoke College (then "Mount Holyoke Female Seminary"); poet
- Annie Dillard, 1967 graduate of Hollins University; Pulitzer Prize–winning author of Pilgrim at Tinker Creek
- Nora Ephron, graduate of Wellesley College; author
- Lendon Gray, 1971 graduate of Sweet Briar College; author and winner of multiple Olympic medals in dressage
- Jasmine Guillory, graduate of Wellesley College; romance novelist and New York Times bestselling author
- H.D., attended Bryn Mawr College; modernist poet
- Molly Haskell, 1961 graduate of Sweet Briar College; author and film critic
- Zora Neale Hurston, 1928 graduate of Barnard College; author
- Gwen Ifill, 1977 graduate of Simmons College; moderator and managing editor of Washington Week in Review; moderator for both the 2004 and 2008 vice presidential debates
- Molly Ivins, 1966 graduate of Smith College; author, journalist, and political commentator
- Helen Keller, graduate of Radcliffe College; author, activist and lecturer; first deafblind person to graduate from college
- Jhumpa Lahiri, 1989 graduate of Barnard College; Pulitzer Prize–winning author
- Ursula K. Le Guin, graduate of Radcliffe College; author
- Madeleine L'Engle, 1941 graduate of Smith College; author
- Ann M. Martin, 1977 graduate of Smith College; author
- Marianne Moore, graduate of Bryn Mawr College; modernist poet
- Marsha Norman, graduate of Agnes Scott College; Pulitzer Prize winner for her drama 'night, Mother
- Flannery O'Connor, graduate of Georgia College & State University; author
- Suzan-Lori Parks, 1985 graduate of Mount Holyoke College; Pulitzer Prize–winning playwright
- Sylvia Plath, 1955 graduate of Smith College; author and poet
- Anna Quindlen, graduate of Barnard College; journalist with the New York Times
- Cokie Roberts, 1964 graduate of Wellesley College; contributing senior news analyst for National Public Radio; regular roundtable analyst for This Week with George Stephanopoulos
- Shaun Robinson, 1984 graduate of Spelman College; Access Hollywood correspondent
- Diane Sawyer, 1967 graduate of Wellesley College; television reporter for ABC and co-anchor of its morning news show, Good Morning America
- Mary Lee Settle, attended Sweet Briar College; author; a founder of the annual PEN/Faulkner Award for Fiction
- Lee Smith, 1967 graduate of Hollins University; author of The Last Girls
- Lesley Stahl, graduate of Wheaton College; reporter for 60 Minutes
- Gertrude Stein, graduate of Radcliffe College; modernist author and critic
- Ann Taylor, attended Sweet Briar College; newscaster for NPR; contributor to All Things Considered since 1989
- Alice Walker, attended Spelman College and Sarah Lawrence College; Pulitzer Prize–winning author
- Barbara Walters, graduate of Sarah Lawrence College; journalist, writer, and media personality who has been a regular fixture on morning television shows (Today and The View), an evening news magazine (20/20), and on World News (then ABC Evening News)
- Wendy Wasserstein, 1971 graduate of Mount Holyoke College; Pulitzer Prize–winning playwright
- Eudora Welty, graduate of Mississippi University for Women; author
- Jane Yolen, 1960 graduate of Smith College; author
- Paula Zahn, graduate of Stephens College; reporter and/or anchor for various networks on numerous programs such as CBS This Morning, CBS Evening News, Good Morning America, The Edge with Paula Zahn, American Morning with Paula Zahn and Paula Zahn Now

== College presidents ==
- Mary Brown Bullock, graduate of Agnes Scott College; its immediate past president
- Nancy Cantor, graduate of Sarah Lawrence College; former Chancellor of University of Illinois at Urbana–Champaign; president of Syracuse University
- Carol T. Christ, graduate of Douglass College (part of Rutgers University); former president of Smith College
- Drew Gilpin Faust, graduate of Bryn Mawr College; first female president of Harvard University
- Helene Gayle, graduate of Barnard College; president of Spelman College, physician and public health professional
- Elaine Tuttle Hansen, graduate of Mount Holyoke College; current president of Bates College
- Ada Howard, graduate of Mount Holyoke College; first president of Wellesley College
- Nannerl O. Keohane, graduate of Wellesley College; Wellesley College president 1981–1993
- Ruth Austin Knox, 1975 graduate of Wesleyan College; 24th president of the college, in 2003
- Audrey F. Manley, graduate of Spelman College; its president, 1997–2002
- Susan Tolman Mills, graduate of Mount Holyoke College; co-founder and first president of Mills College
- Carol Ann Mooney, graduate of Saint Mary's College; president 2004–2016
- Nancy J. Vickers, graduate of Mount Holyoke College; president of Bryn Mawr College, 1997–2008
- Diana Chapman Walsh, graduate of Wellesley College; Wellesley College president 1993–2007
- Leocadia I. Zak, graduate of Mount Holyoke College; current president of Agnes Scott College

== Computer science, engineering, science, social science ==
- Ruth Benedict, 1909 graduate of Vassar College; anthropologist
- Leah Busque, 2001 graduate of Sweet Briar College; founder and CEO of TaskRabbit
- Annie Jump Cannon, 1884 graduate of Wellesley College; astronomer who developed the well-known Henry Draper Catalogue of stars based upon temperature
- Rachel Carson, graduate of Chatham University; author of Silent Spring, the book which is credited with advancing the global environmental movement
- Marjorie Grene, 1931 graduate of Wellesley College; earned Ph.D. from Radcliffe College in 1935; internationally recognized as a major philosopher of biology
- Grace Hopper, 1928 graduate of Vassar College; computer scientist who developed the first compiler for a computer programming language
- Susan Kare, 1975 graduate of Mount Holyoke College; original designer of many of the interface elements for the original Apple Macintosh
- Stephanie Kwolek, 1946 graduate of Margaret Morrison Carnegie College; inventor of Kevlar
- Margaret Mead, 1923 graduate of Barnard College; anthropologist
- Pamela Melroy, 1983 graduate of Wellesley College; former NASA astronaut; pilot on Space Shuttle missions STS-92 and STS-112; commanded mission STS-120
- Jean E. Sammet, 1948 graduate of Mount Holyoke College; inventor of the FORMAC programming language
- Marshalyn Yeargin-Allsopp, 1968 graduate of Sweet Briar College; medical epidemiologist and chief of the developmental disabilities branch at the Centers for Disease Control and Prevention

== Government officials ==
- Stacey Abrams, 1995 graduate of Spelman College; first black woman major-party gubernatorial nominee in the United States
- Madeleine Albright, 1959 graduate of Wellesley College; first female secretary of state
- Tammy Baldwin, graduate of Smith College; first openly gay U.S. senator
- Colleen Bell, graduate of Sweet Briar College; in 2015 became the U.S. ambassador to Hungary
- Benazir Bhutto, graduate of Radcliffe College; first woman elected to lead a Muslim state; Pakistan's first (and to date only) female prime minister, serving twice, 1988–1990 and 1993–1996
- Elaine Chao, 1975 graduate of Mount Holyoke College; secretary of Labor and secretary of Transportation; first Asian American woman to be appointed to the president's cabinet
- Hillary Clinton, 1969 graduate of Wellesley College; former secretary of state for Barack Obama; formerly the junior United States senator from New York; former First Lady of the United States (1993–2001)
- Ruth A. Davis, 1966 graduate of Spelman College; first woman of color to be appointed Director General of the Foreign Service; first African-American director of the Foreign Service Institute
- Geraldine Ferraro, 1956 graduate of Marymount Manhattan College; first woman to represent a major U.S. political party as a candidate for vice president, in 1984
- Gabby Giffords, 1993 graduate of Scripps College; represented Arizona's 8th Congressional district from 2007 until her resignation in 2012 due to the aftermath of an assassination attempt
- Katherine Harris, 1979 graduate of Agnes Scott College; former Florida secretary of state and U.S. representative
- Elizabeth P. Hoisington, 1940 graduate of the College of Notre Dame of Maryland; one of the first two women to be promoted to brigadier general in the United States Army, at the time being director of the Women's Army Corps; President Nixon announced her promotion in 1970
- Katherine G. Howard, attended Salem Academy and Salem College before graduating from Smith College; worked in the Eisenhower administration in the Federal Civil Defense Administration, as the U.S. delegate to the NATO committee on civil defense, and as deputy U.S. commissioner general to the Brussels World Fair
- Frank M. Hull, 1970 graduate of Randolph-Macon Woman's College; judge on the United States Court of Appeals for the Eleventh Circuit
- Jeane Jordan Kirkpatrick, graduate of Stephens College (then a two-year institution) and later Barnard College; first female U.S. Ambassador to the U.N.
- Blanche Lincoln, 1982 graduate of Randolph-Macon Woman's College; Democratic U.S. senator from Arkansas, 1999–2011; previously served in the U.S. House of Representatives from Arkansas' 1st congressional district; at age 38, was the youngest woman to be elected to the Senate, in 1998
- Mary McLeod Bethune, 1894 graduate of Scotia Seminary (now Barber–Scotia College); an adviser to President Franklin D. Roosevelt
- Barbara Mikulski, 1958 graduate of Mount St. Agnes College, now part of Loyola College in Baltimore, Maryland; graduate of the Institute of Notre Dame; the senior woman in the United States Senate; Maryland's senior Senator
- Nancy Pelosi, 1962 graduate of Trinity College (now Trinity Washington University); graduate of the Institute of Notre Dame in Baltimore; first female speaker of the House
- Frances Perkins, 1902 graduate of Mount Holyoke College; first female cabinet member (U.S. secretary of Labor, 1933–1945, under Franklin D. Roosevelt)
- Sarah Childress Polk, attended Salem Female Academy in 1817 (later became Salem College); wife of U.S. President James K. Polk
- Emily J. Reynolds, 1978 graduate of Stephens College; secretary of the United States Senate, 2003–2007; senior vice president for government relations with the Tennessee Valley Authority
- Virginia Shehee, graduate of Stephens College; first woman elected to the Louisiana State Senate (1975)
- Patsy Ticer, 1955 graduate of Sweet Briar College; member of the Virginia Senate, 1996–2012
- Teresa Tomlinson, 1987 graduate from Sweet Briar College; first woman to be elected mayor of Columbus, Georgia, in 2011; became the chair of Sweet Briar's board of directors
- Susan Webber Wright, 1970 graduate of Randolph-Macon Woman's College; U.S. district court judge in Little Rock, Arkansas; presided over Paula Jones's sexual harassment lawsuit against former President Bill Clinton; was involved with the investigation of the Whitewater scandal with Kenneth Starr

== Performing artists, producers, composers and visual artists ==
- Laurie Anderson, graduate of Barnard College; avant-garde artist and musician
- Elizabeth Bell, 1950 graduate of Wellesley College; composer
- Debra Martin Chase, graduate of Mount Holyoke College; Hollywood producer
- China Chow, 1996 graduate of Scripps College; actress
- Sofia Coppola, attended Mills College; director
- Ruby Dee, attended Hunter College; actor
- Denise Di Novi, graduate of Simmons College; Hollywood producer
- Fortune Feimster, graduate of Peace College; comedian, actress
- Nnenna Freelon, graduate of Simmons College; jazz vocalist
- Greta Gerwig, graduate of Barnard College; actress, writer, director, and producer; nominated for an Oscar for Lady Bird
- Lauren Graham, graduate of Barnard College; actress best known for her role as Lorelai Gilmore on popular TV series Gilmore Girls
- Katharine Hepburn, 1928 graduate of Bryn Mawr College; actress
- Keshia Knight Pulliam, graduate of Spelman College; best known for her role as Rudy Huxtable on The Cosby Show
- Beth Leavel, graduate of Meredith College; Tony Award–winning actress
- Ali MacGraw, graduate of Wellesley College; actress best known for performance in Goodbye, Columbus (1969) and Love Story (1970)
- Sally Mann, 1974 graduate of Hollins University; photographer
- Elizabeth Mitchell, graduate of Stephens College; television actress
- Diana Muldaur, 1960 graduate of Sweet Briar College; movie and TV actress; first female president of the Academy of Television Arts & Sciences
- Jennifer Nettles, graduate of Agnes Scott College; lead singer of Grammy-winning country band Sugarland
- Annie Potts, graduate of Stephens College; actress
- Mercedes Ruehl, 1969 graduate of The College of New Rochelle; Academy Award–winning stage and screen actress
- Maggie Siff, graduate of Bryn Mawr College; actress
- Meryl Streep, graduate of Vassar College; actress
- Ann Taylor, attended Sweet Briar College before transferring and graduating from the University of Tennessee; newscaster for National Public Radio (NPR)
- Twyla Tharp, 1963 graduate of Barnard College; figure in the world of dance
- Jennifer Tilly, graduate of Stephens College; Academy Award-nominated actress
- Suzanne Vega, graduate of Barnard College; musician
- Celia Weston, graduate of Salem College; actress; nominated for an Oscar for Dead Man Walking and a Tony for The Last Night of Ballyhoo
