= List of Bosnia and Herzegovina women writers =

This is a list of women writers who were born in Bosnia and Herzegovina or whose writings are closely associated with that country.

== A ==
- Bisera Alikadić (born 1939), poet, novelist, children's writer

== B ==
- Nura Bazdulj-Hubijar (born 1951), novelist, poet, playwright, young adults writer

== C ==
- Umihana Čuvidina (c.1794–c.1870), early poet, songwriter

== F ==
- Zlata Filipović (born 1980), diarist, non-fiction writer, author of Zlata's Diary

== K ==
- Nasiha Kapidžić-Hadžić (1932–1995), children's writer, poet, textbook writer

== M ==
- Senka Marić (born 1972), poet and novelist
- Ognjenka Milićević (1927–2008), biographer, essayist, translator

== O ==
- Ljubica Ostojić (1945–2021), poet, playwright, short story writer, critic, educator
- Téa Obreht (born 1985), American-Bosniak novelist, author of The Tiger's Wife

== S ==
- Staka Skenderova (c.1830–1891), first woman author published in Bosnia
- Tanja Stupar-Trifunović (born 1977), poet and novelist, winner of 2017 European Union Prize for Literature

== See also ==
- List of women writers
