= Women in the Tasmanian House of Assembly =

There have been 45 women in the Tasmanian House of Assembly since its establishment in 1856. Women have had the right to vote since 1903 and the right to stand as candidates since 1921.

The first successful female candidates for the House of Assembly were Amelia Best and Mabel Miller, both Liberals, who were elected in 1955. In 1962, Miller (Best had lost election twice, in 1956 and 1959) was joined by the first Labor woman, Lynda Heaven. In 1964, both Miller and Heaven left the House, and women were not represented again until 1976, when Labor's Gill James was elected. Since then women have been continuously represented in the House.

Christine Milne and Di Hollister were the first women elected to represent the Greens in 1989. Kristie Johnston was the first independent woman elected in 2021, although Mary Willey, Madeleine Ogilvie and Sue Hickey had served as independents after leaving their parties. Kathryn Hay was the first Indigenous woman elected to the Tasmanian parliament in 2002.

Lara Giddings became the first female Premier of Tasmania on 24 January 2011.

With the re-election of Madeleine Ogilvie on 11 September 2019, the House of Assembly became Australia's first state to elect a majority of women members in one house, with 13 of the 25 members being female.

== List of women in the Tasmanian House of Assembly ==
Names in bold indicate women who have been appointed as Ministers and Parliamentary Secretaries during their time in Parliament. Names in italics indicate women who were first elected at a recount, and * symbolises members that have sat as members in both the Legislative Assembly and the Legislative Council.

#	Name	Party	Electoral Division	Period of service
1	Amelia Best	Liberal	Wilmot	19 February 1955 – 13 October 1956 (defeated); 24 November 1958 – 2 May 1959 (defeated)
1	Mabel Miller	Liberal	Franklin	19 February 1955 – 2 May 1964 (defeated)
3	Lynda Heaven	Labor	Franklin	2 March 1962 – 2 May 1964 (defeated)
4	**Gill James**	Labor	Bass	11 December 1976 – 8 February 1986 (defeated); 1 February 1992 – 20 July 2002 (retired)
5	Mary Willey	Labor/Independent	Bass	28 July 1979 – 27 May 1982 (defeated)
6	Carmel Holmes	Liberal	Denison	25 June 1984 – 8 February 1986 (defeated)
7	**Judy Jackson**	Labor	Denison	8 February 1986 – 18 March 2006 (retired)
7	**Fran Bladel**	Labor	Franklin	8 February 1986 – 9 April 2002 (retired)
9	Christine Milne	Greens	Lyons	13 May 1989 – 29 August 1998 (defeated)
9	Di Hollister	Greens	Braddon	13 May 1989 – 29 August 1998 (defeated)
11	Carole Cains	Liberal	Braddon	1 February 1992 – 24 February 1996 (defeated); 17 July 1997 – 29 August 1998 (defeated)
11	**Sue Napier**	Liberal	Bass	1 February 1992 – 19 March 2010 (retired)
13	Peg Putt	Greens	Denison	2 March 1992 – 7 July 2008 (resigned)
14	**Denise Swan**	Liberal	Lyons	12 December 1995 – 20 July 2002 (defeated)
15	**Lara Giddings**	Labor	Lyons; Franklin	24 February 1996 – 29 August 1998 (defeated); 20 July 2002 – 3 March 2018 (retired)
15	**Paula Wriedt**	Labor	Franklin	24 February 1996 – 18 January 2009 (resigned)
17	**Kathryn Hay**	Labor	Bass	20 July 2002 – 18 March 2006 (retired)
18	Heather Butler	Labor	Lyons	10 May 2005 – 20 March 2010 (defeated)
19	**Michelle O'Byrne**	Labor	Bass	18 March 2006 – 19 July 2025 (retired)
19	**Lisa Singh**	Labor	Denison	18 March 2006 – 20 March 2010 (defeated)
21	**Cassy O'Connor**	Greens	Denison/Clark	21 July 2008 – 13 July 2023 (resigned)
22	**Elise Archer**	Liberal	Denison/Clark	20 March 2010 – 4 October 2023 (resigned)
22	**Jacquie Petrusma**	Liberal	Franklin	20 March 2010 – 25 July 2022 (resigned); 23 March 2024 –
22	**Rebecca White**	Labor	Lyons	20 March 2010 – 12 February 2025 (resigned)
25	**Sarah Courtney**	Liberal	Bass	15 March 2014 – 10 February 2022 (resigned)
25	**Madeleine Ogilvie**	Labor/Independent/Liberal	Denison/Clark	15 March 2014 – 3 March 2018 (defeated); 13 September 2019 –
25	Joan Rylah	Liberal	Braddon	15 March 2014 – 3 March 2018 (defeated); 26 February 2019 – 27 July 2020 (resigned)
28	Andrea Dawkins	Greens	Bass	9 June 2015 – 3 March 2018 (defeated)
29	Rosalie Woodruff	Greens	Franklin	17 August 2015 –
30	Jen Butler	Labor	Lyons	3 March 2018 –
30	Anita Dow	Labor	Braddon	3 March 2018 –
30	Ella Haddad	Labor	Denison/Clark	3 March 2018 –
30	Sue Hickey	Liberal/Independent	Denison/Clark	3 March 2018 – 1 May 2021 (defeated)
30	Jennifer Houston	Labor	Bass	3 March 2018 – 1 May 2021 (defeated)
30	Alison Standen	Labor	Franklin	3 March 2018 – 1 May 2021 (defeated)
36	Janie Finlay	Labor	Bass	1 May 2021 –
36	Kristie Johnston	Independent	Clark	1 May 2021 –
38	Lara Alexander	Liberal	Bass	25 February 2022 – 23 March 2024 (defeated)
39	Tabatha Badger	Greens	Lyons	23 March 2024 –
39	Miriam Beswick	Jacqui Lambie Network	Braddon	23 March 2024 – 19 July 2025 (defeated)
39	Meg Brown	Labor	Franklin	23 March 2024 –
39	Helen Burnet	Greens	Clark	23 March 2024 –
39	**Jane Howlett***	Liberal	Lyons	23 March 2024 –
39	Rebekah Pentland	Jacqui Lambie Network	Bass	23 March 2024 – 19 July 2025 (defeated)
39	Cecily Rosol	Greens	Bass	23 March 2024 –
46	Bridget Archer	Liberal	Bass	19 July 2025 –
46	Jess Greene	Labor	Bass	19 July 2025 –
