= African jazz =

African jazz may refer to:

- Le Grand Kallé et l'African Jazz, a Congolese band often referred to as "African Jazz"
- A style of music also known as Ethio-jazz, exemplified by Mulatu Astatke
- South African jazz, sometimes called "African jazz"

== See also ==
- Cape jazz
- Ethiopian jazz
- Malawian jazz
- Zimbabwean jazz
- Marabi
