= Heaven Fitch =

American wrestler (born 2003)

Personal information
- Born: March 1, 2003 (age 23)
- Education: Uwharrie Charter Academy

Sport
- Sport: Wrestling

Heaven Fitch (born March 1, 2003) is an American folkstyle wrestler. She wrestled in the 106-pound weight class.

Fitch wrestled at Uwharrie Charter Academy in Asheboro, North Carolina. During sophomore year in 2019, Fitch became the first female wrestler to place at the North Carolina wrestling state tournament, when she placed fourth in the 1A 106-pound weight class. During her junior year, she won the 2020 NCHSAA 1A 106-pound state championship, making her the first female wrestler in North Carolina history to win an individual wrestling state championship. That same year, she was also named Most Outstanding Wrestler of the 1A tournament. She ended her junior season with a 54–4 record. During her senior year in 2021, she lost in the 1A semi-finals to eventual state champion and former opponent from the previous year, Luke Wilson of Robbinsville, finishing third in the 1A 106-pound class.

Fitch was inspired to start wrestling after watching her older brothers participate in the sport. At six years old, Fitch told her parents she wanted to wrestle. They told her no at first, however soon after they allowed her to start wrestling. "HEAVEN", a documentary of Fitch's career, was released on the WWE Network on March 7, 2021, narrated by WWE Hall of Famer, Beth Phoenix.
