= List of Denmark Open women's singles champions =

Below is the list of the winners at the Denmark Open in badminton in women's singles.

Year	Champion	Runner-up	Score
1935-1936	(Denmark) Ruth Frederiksen		
1936-1937	(Denmark) Tonny Olsen		
1937-1938	(England) D. M. C. Young		
1938-1939	(Denmark) Tonny Olsen		
1939; 1944	No competition		
1945-1946	(Denmark) Tonny Olsen		
1946-1947	(Denmark) Tonny Olsen		
1947-1948	(Denmark) Tonny Olsen		
1948-1949	(Denmark) Tonny Olsen		
1949-1950	(Denmark) Tonny Olsen		
1950-1951	(Denmark) Tonny Olsen		
1951-1952	(Denmark) Aase Schiøtt Jacobsen		
1952-1953	(Denmark) Aase Schiøtt Jacobsen		
1953-1954	No competition		
1954-1955	(Denmark) Aase Schiøtt Jacobsen		
1955; 1964	No competition		
1965-1966	(Denmark) Lizbeth von Barnekow		
1966-1967	(Japan) Noriko Takagi		
1967-1968	(Sweden) Eva Twedberg		
1968-1969	(Japan) Hiroe Yuki		
1969-1970	(Sweden) Eva Twedberg		
1970-1971	(Japan) Noriko Takagi		
1971-1972	(Sweden) Eva Twedberg		
1972-1973	(Japan) Hiroe Yuki		
1973-1974	(Japan) Hiroe Yuki		
1974-1975	(Denmark) Lene Køppen		
1975-1976	(Denmark) Lene Køppen		
1976-1977	(Japan) Hiroe Yuki		
1977-1978	(Denmark) Lene Køppen		
1978-1979	(Denmark) Lene Køppen		
1979-1980	(Japan) Yoshiko Yonekura		
1980-1981	(Denmark) Lene Køppen		
1981-1982	(China) Wu Jiangqui		
1982-1983	(China) Qian Ping		
1983-1984	(Denmark) Kirsten Larsen		
1984-1985	(China) Zheng Yuli		
1985-1986	(South Korea) Yun Ja Kim		
1986-1987	(China) Zheng Yuli		
1987-1988	(South Korea) Lee Young-Suk		
1988-1989	(China) Li Lingwei		
1989-1990	(China) Tang Jiuhong		
1990-1991	(China) Tang Jiuhong	(China) Zhou Lei	11–3, 11–2
1991-1992	(Indonesia) Susi Susanti	(China) Huang Hua	11–5, 6–11, 11–8
1992-1993	(Indonesia) Susi Susanti	(Sweden) Lim Xiao Qing	11–3, 11–3
1993-1994	(China) Ye Zhaoying	(China) Liu Yuhong	
1994-1995	(Denmark) Camilla Martin	(Sweden) Lim Xiao Qing	
1995-1996	(Sweden) Lim Xiaoqing	(China) Wang Chen	11–6, 11–3
1996-1997	(China) Gong Zhichao	(Sweden) Marina Andrievskaya	
1997-1998	(Denmark) Camilla Martin	(Denmark) Mette Pedersen	11–2, 11–8
1998-1999	(Denmark) Camilla Martin	(China) Ye Zhaoying	13–10, 11–8
1999-2000	(Denmark) Camilla Martin	(China) Zhou Mi	8–11, 11–4, 11–1
2000-2001	(China) Zhou Mi	(Denmark) Camilla Martin	1–11, 11–6, 11–7
2001-2002	(Denmark) Camilla Martin	(China) Pi Hongyan	8–6, 7–3, 7–0
2002-2003	(Denmark) Camilla Martin		
2003-2004	(China) Gong Ruina		
2004-2005	(China) Xie Xingfang		
2005	(France) Pi Hongyan	(Germany) Xu Huaiwen	7–11, 11–4, 11–5
2006	(China) Jiang Yanjiao	(China) Lu Lan	21–14, 21–14
2007	(China) Lu Lan	(China) Zhang Ning	21–17, 21–14
2008	(China) Wang Lin	(Hong Kong) Zhou Mi	21–18, 21–10
2009	(Denmark) Tine Rasmussen	(China) Wang Yihan	21–18, 19–21, 21–14
2010	(China) Wang Yihan	(China) Liu Xin	21–14, 21–12
2011	(China) Wang Xin	(China) Wang Yihan	21–14, 23–21
2012	(India) Saina Nehwal	(Germany) Juliane Schenk	21–17, 21–8
2013	(China) Wang Yihan	(South Korea) Sung Ji-hyun	16–21, 21–18, 22–20
