= List of Romanian women artists =

This is a list of women artists who were born in Romania or whose artworks are closely associated with that country.

== A ==
- Nina Arbore (1889–1942), painter, illustrator

== B ==
- Zoe Băicoianu (1910–1987), sculptor, ceramist
- Silvia Barbescu (born 1961), multidisciplinary artist
- Elena Alexandrina Bednarik (1883–1939), painter and teacher
- Geta Brătescu (1926–2018), visual artist

== C ==
- Silvia Cambir (1924–2007), expressionist painter, illustrator
- Ioana Ciolacu (born 1982), fashion designer
- Lena Constante (1909–2005), painter, writer
- Margaret Cossaceanu or Margaret Cossaceanu-Lavrillier (1893–1980), sculptor
- Cecilia Cuțescu-Storck (1879–1969), influential painter, sculptor and feminist

== D ==
- Margarete Depner (1885–1970), sculptor, painter, illustrator
- Felicia Donceanu (1931–2022), painter, sculptor, composer
- Natalia Dumitresco (1915–1997), French-Romanian abstract painter

== E ==
- Céline Emilian (1898–1983), sculptor

== L ==
- Myra Landau (1926–2018), abstract painter

== M ==
- Ana Maria Micu (born 1979), visual artist

== N ==
- Georgeta Năpăruș (1930–1997), modernist painter
- Alexandra Nechita (born 1985), cubist painter, philanthropist
- Margareta Niculescu (1926–2018), painter, puppeteer, educator

== P ==
- Lili Pancu (1908–2006), painter
- Milița Petrașcu (1892–1976), painter, sculptor
- Laura Poantă (born 1971), physician, writer, painter
- Elena Popea (1879–1941), painter
- Florica Prevenda (born 1959), painter

== R ==
- Silvia Radu (born 1935), sculptor, potter, painter
- Magdalena Rădulescu (1902–1983), painter, illustrator
- Alma Redlinger (1924–2017), painter, illustrator
- Maria Rusescu (born 1936), painter

== S ==
- Irina Schrotter (born 1965), fashion designer
- Hedda Sterne (1910–2011), painter

== T ==
- Laura Taler (born 1969), performance artist
- Maria Tănase (1913–1963), singer and actress

== U ==
- Andra Ursuța (born 1979), sculptor

== Z ==
- Marian Zidaru (born 1956), sculptor and painter
