= List of Chi Omega members =

The list of Chi Omega members includes initiated and honorary members of Chi Omega.

== Notable members ==
=== Business ===
| Name | Chapter | Notability | Ref. |
|---|---|---|---|
| Safra A. Catz | Beta Alpha | President and Chief Financial Officer of Oracle Corporation | |
| Mignon Faget | Rho | New Orleans–based jewelry designer | |
| Nancy Walton Laurie | Psi | Namesake of the Leadership Institute of Chi Omega; niece of Sam Walton, founder of Wal-Mart | |
| Alice Marriot | Xi Alpha | Entrepreneur and philanthropist, wife of J. Willard Marriott | |

=== Entertainment ===
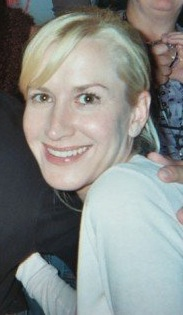
Angela Kinsey

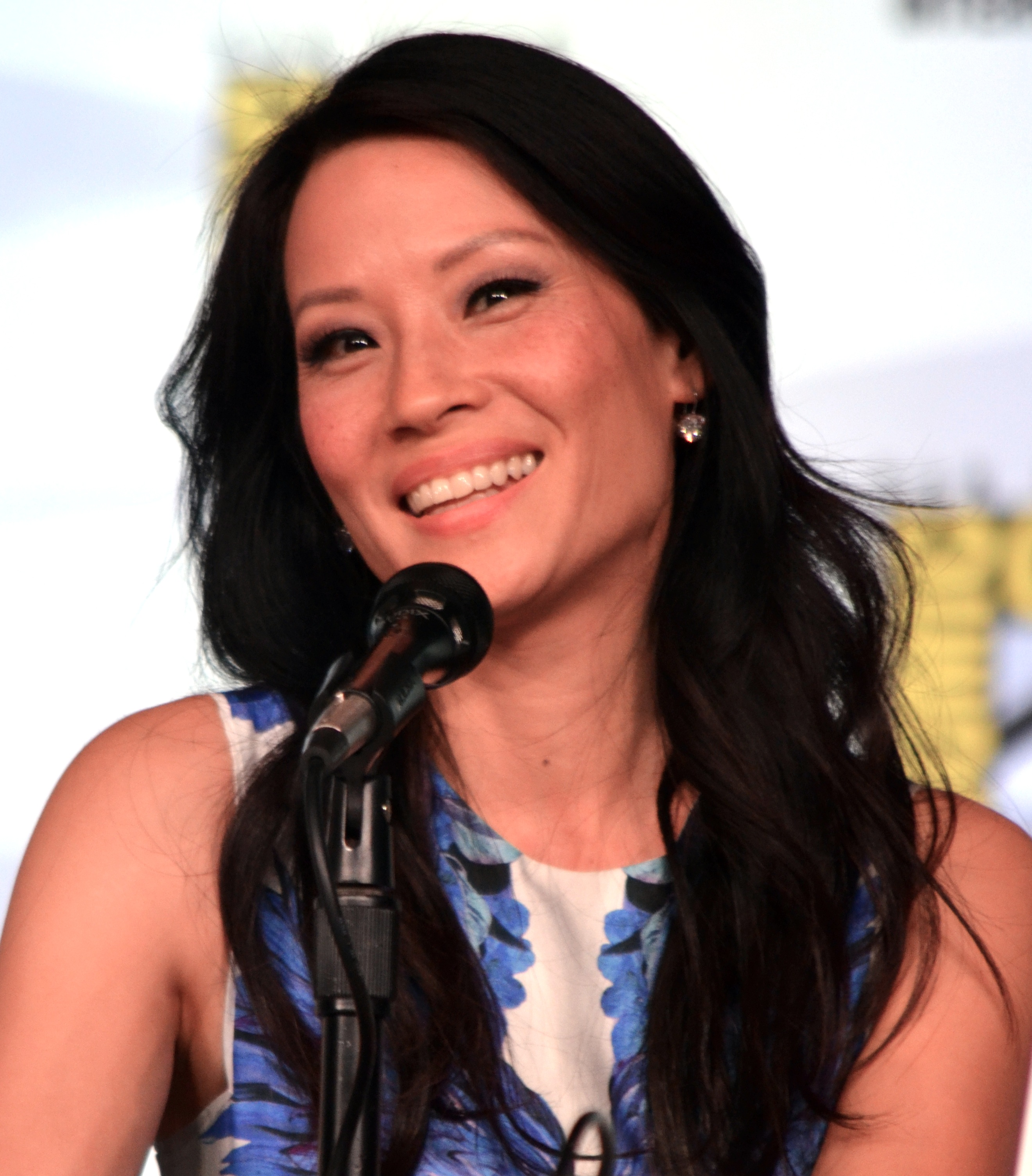
Lucy Liu

| Name | Chapter | Notability | Ref. |
|---|---|---|---|
| Natalie Allen | Epsilon Delta | CNN anchor | |
| Rhonda Bates | Chi Epsilon | Actress; The Roller Girls | |
| Sarah Swift | Iota Alpha | Miss Colorado 2023 | |
| Kathryn Crosby | Iota | Actress | |
| Joyce DeWitt | Phi Epsilon | Actress; Three's Company | |
| Hope Driskill | Rho Alpha | Miss Missouri 2011 and Top 16 Miss USA, Survivor: Caramoan | |
| Melissa Claire Egan | Epsilon Beta | Actress; All My Children | |
| Ruth Ford | Tau | Actress | |
| Taryn Foshee | Phi Delta | Miss Mississippi, 3rd runner up to Miss America | |
| Sarah Hider | Tau Alpha | Miss Ohio 2015 | |
| Sylvia Hitchcock | Nu Beta | 1967 Miss USA and Miss Universe | |
| Liza Huber | Epsilon Beta | Actress | |
| Angela Kinsey | Theta Kappa | Actress; The Office | |
| Lynne Koplitz | Iota Kappa | Stand-up comedian | |
| Toby Lightman | Nu | Singer/songwriter | |
| Lucy Liu | Eta | Actress known for her work on Charlie's Angels and Kill Bill, and her role as Ling Woo on Ally McBeal | |
| Lynda Lee Mead | Tau | 1960 Miss America, owner and president of Shea Design & French Country Imports | |
| Linda Miller | Rho | Actress; All My Children | |
| Mary Ann Mobley | Tau | Former Miss America (1959) and television actress | |
| Beth Moore | Alpha Zeta | American evangelist, author, and bible teacher | |
| Annie Mumolo | Mu | Actress, writer, and producer; Bridesmaids | |
| Catt Sadler | Theta Beta | E! News, E!'s Daily Ten | |
| Shannon Sanderford | Epsilon Alpha | Miss Texas 2015 | |
| Mikaela Shaw | Psi Delta | Miss Wyoming 2015 | |
| Heather Thomas | Gamma Beta | Actress; The Fall Guy | |
| Kat Timpf | Rho Gamma | Co-host; Gutfeld! Author; The Fifth Column, The Fox News Specialists, You Can't Joke About That, I Used to Like You Until | |
| Adair Tishler | Rho Mu | Child actress | |
| Sela Ward | Nu Beta | Actress; Sisters, The Fugitive, Once and Again, Dirty Dancing Havana Nights, House | |
| Joanne Woodward | Phi Gamma | Academy Award Actress; Philadelphia, The Three Faces of Eve | |

=== Government ===
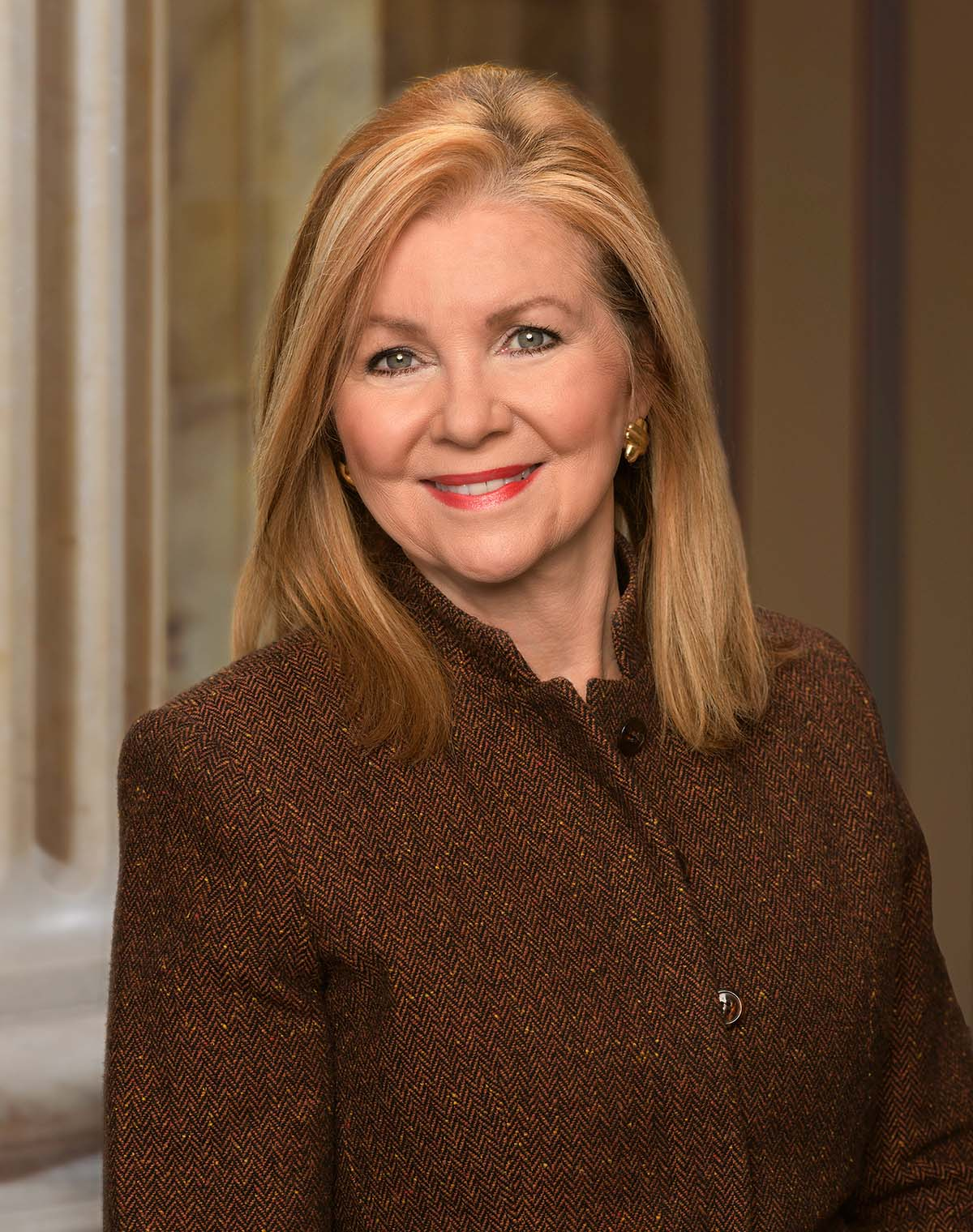
Marsha Blackburn

| Name | Chapter | Notability | Ref. |
|---|---|---|---|
| Marsha Blackburn | Phi Delta | United States Senator representing Tennessee; former Republican member of the United States House of Representatives representing Tennessee | |
| Katie Britt | Nu Beta | United States Senator representing Alabama | |
| Martha Layne Collins | Lambda Alpha | Former Governor of Kentucky | |
| Alison Lundergan Grimes | Kappa Beta | Former Secretary of State of Kentucky | |
| Shirley Hufstedler | Pi Gamma | First United States Secretary of Education | |
| Blanche Lincoln | Psi | Former United States Senator from Arkansas | |
| Molly Beth Malcolm | Sigma Zeta | First woman chairperson of the Texas Democratic Party | |
| Stephanie Murphy | Omicron Beta | Democratic member of the United States House of Representatives representing Florida's 7th Congressional District | |
| Jen Psaki | Omicron Beta | White House Press Secretary, Democratic Party | |
| Vickie Sawyer | Delta Kappa | Republican member of the North Carolina Senate | |
| Patricia Schroeder | Pi Beta | Former Democratic member of the United States House of Representatives representing Colorado, first female Congresswoman from Colorado | |
| Joanna Shields | Nu Gamma | Baroness and British Parliamentarian | |
| Virginia Smith | Kappa | Former Republican member of the United States House of Representatives representing Nebraska | |
| Carole Keeton Strayhorn | Iota | Former Texas Comptroller, made an unsuccessful run for Texas Governor in 2006 as an independent | |
| Mary Ann Tobin | Lambda Alpha | Former Kentucky Auditor of Public Accounts | |

=== Literature ===
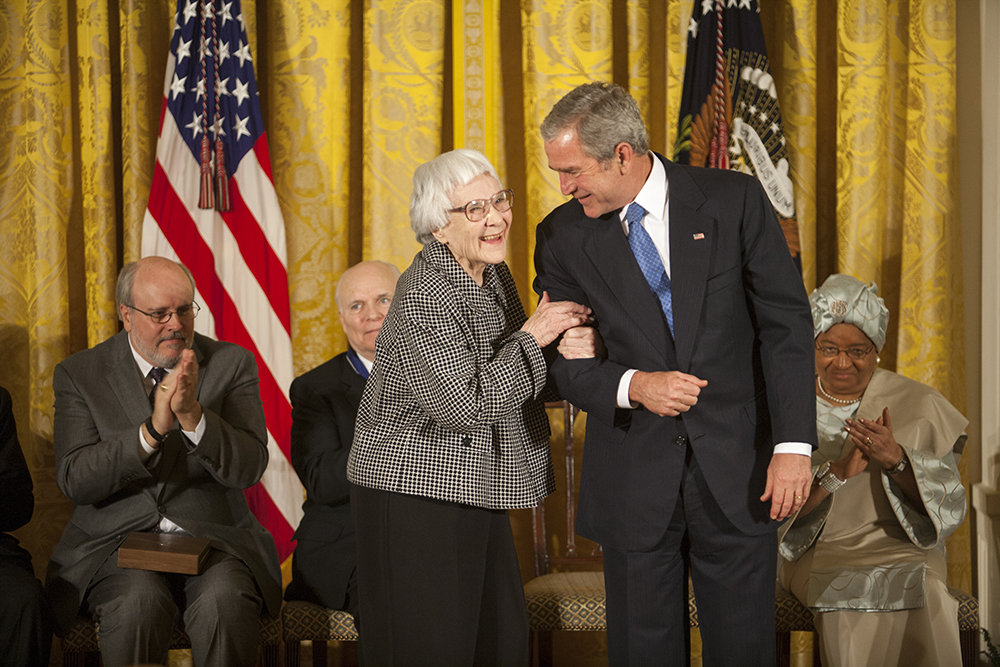
Harper Lee

| Name | Chapter | Notability | Ref. |
|---|---|---|---|
| Ellen Gilchrist | Sigma Epsilon | Author of Victory Over Japan, winner of the 1984 National Book Award for Fiction | |
| Harper Lee | Nu Beta | Author of To Kill a Mockingbird, Presidential Medal of Freedom recipient in 2007 | |
| Frances Mayes | Sigma | Author of the novel Under the Tuscan Sun | |
| Anita Shreve | Chi Alpha | Author of The Pilot's Wife, The Weight of Water, and Sea Glass; O. Henry Award recipient in 1976 | |
| Genevieve Taggard | Mu | 1931 Guggenheim Fellow and poet | |
| Karen White | Rho | New York Times bestselling romantic fiction author | |

=== Philanthropy ===
| Name | Chapter | Notability | Ref. |
|---|---|---|---|
| Cynthia Germanotta | Theta | Philanthropist, President of Born This Way Foundation, mother of Lady Gaga | |
| Patricia Walton Shelby | Phi Delta | 32nd President General of the Daughters of the American Revolution | |

=== Science and education ===
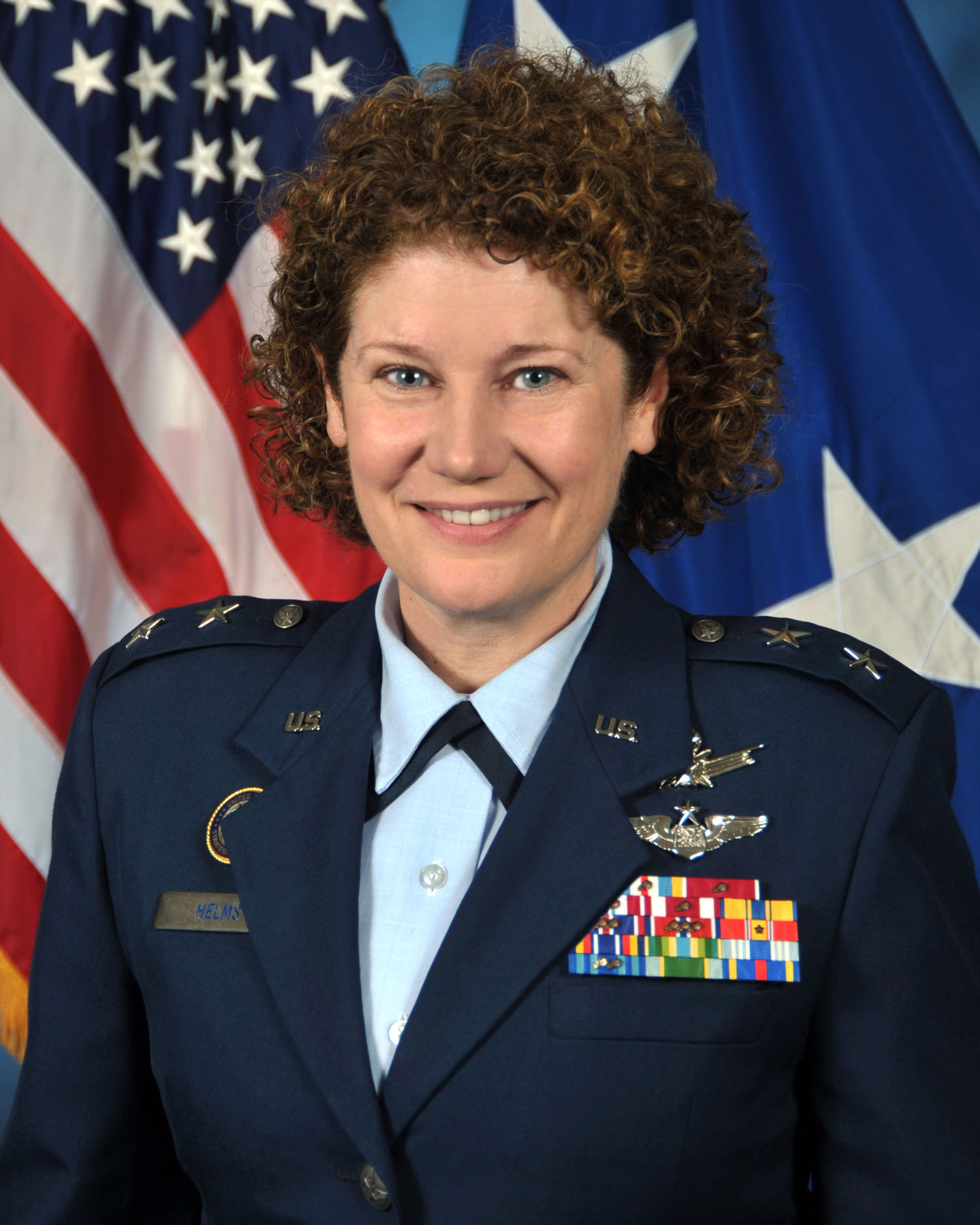
Susan J. Helms

| Name | Chapter | Notability | Ref. |
|---|---|---|---|
| Susan Athey | Mu Kappa | Professor of Economics at Harvard University, won the John Bates Clark Medal in 2007 | |
| Susan J. Helms | Pi Gamma | NASA astronaut and the first woman to live on the International Space Station | |
| Dawn Clark Netsch | Xi | Law professor at Northwestern University, Illinois Comptroller | |
| Janet Morgan Riggs | Tau Delta | President of Gettysburg College | |
| Kathleen Rubins | Kappa Lambda | Selected as a member of the 20th NASA astronaut class | |
| Martha Dunagin Saunders | Epsilon Delta | President of the University of Southern Mississippi | |

=== Sports ===
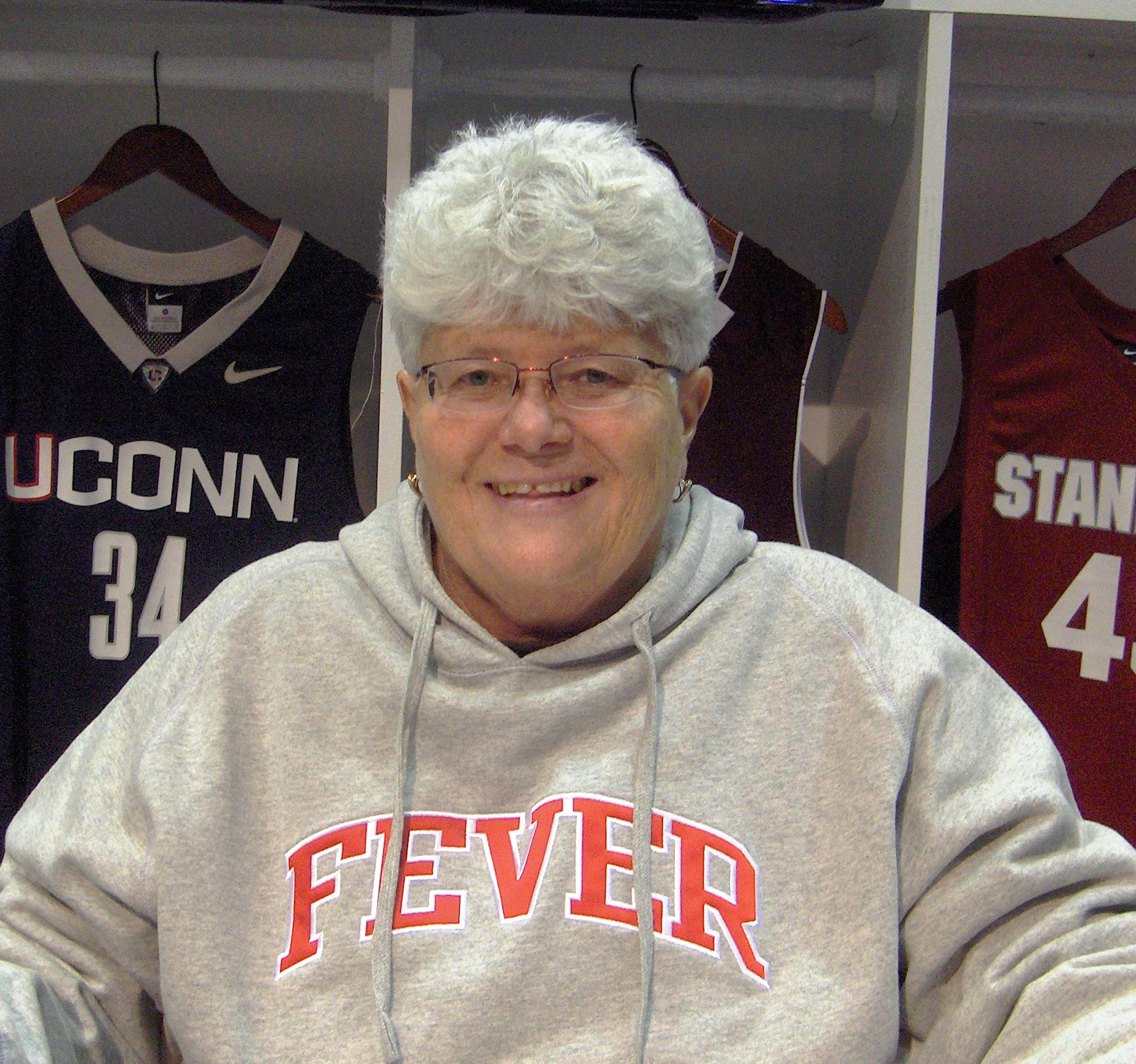
Lin Dunn

| Name | Chapter | Notability | Ref. |
|---|---|---|---|
| Christine Brennan | Xi | USA Today sports columnist, author, and sports commentator for ABC News, CNN, National Public Radio and Fox Sports Radio | |
| Lin Dunn | Xi Zeta | Head basketball coach for WNBA teams Seattle Storm (2000–2002) and Indiana Fever (2008–present) | |
| Melissa McNamara | Epsilon Gamma | Head coach of the Arizona State University Sun Devils women's golf team (2009 NCAA champions) and former pro golfer on the LPGA tour | |
| Pat Summitt | Xi Zeta | Head coach of the Tennessee Lady Volunteers basketball team, Basketball Hall of Fame and Women's Basketball Hall of Fame inductee | |
