= List of consorts of Bremen-Verden =

== Duchess consort of Bremen and Verden ==
=== House of Vasa, 1648–1654 ===
Christina of Sweden was Queen of Sweden, not a consort.

=== House of Palatinate-Zweibrücken, 1654–1719 ===
Picture	Name	Father	Birth	Marriage	Became Duchess-Princess	Ceased to be Duchess-Princess	Death	Spouse
	Hedwig Eleonora of Holstein-Gottorp	Frederick III, Duke of Holstein-Gottorp (Holstein-Gottorp)	23 October 1636	24 October 1654		13 February 1660 husband's death	24 November 1715	Charles I Gustav
	Ulrike Eleonora of Denmark	Frederick III of Denmark (Oldenburg)	11 September 1656	6 May 1680		26 July 1693		Charles II

=== House of Hanover, 1715–1823 ===
Picture	Name	Father	Birth	Marriage	Became Duchess-Princess	Ceased to be Duchess-Princess	Death	Spouse
	Caroline of Ansbach	Johann Friedrich, Margrave of Brandenburg-Ansbach (Hohenzollern)	1 March 1683	22 August 1705	11 June 1727 husband's ascension	20 November 1737		George II Augustus
	Charlotte of Mecklenburg-Strelitz	Duke Charles Louis Frederick of Mecklenburg (Mecklenburg)	19 May 1744	8 September 1761		6 August 1806; Losted during the Great French War	17 November 1818	George III (1st reign)
Interregnum
	Charlotte of Mecklenburg-Strelitz	Duke Charles Louis Frederick of Mecklenburg (Mecklenburg)	19 May 1744	8 September 1761	19 October 1813; Restored to Hanover	17 November 1818		George III (2nd reign)
	Caroline of Brunswick	Charles William Ferdinand, Duke of Brunswick (Welf)	17 May 1768	8 April 1795	29 January 1820 husband's ascension	7 August 1821		George IV
