= List of 19th-century women politicians =

This is a list of 19th-century women politicians. The term politician refer to members of the modern political system, such as members of political partiers, city councillors and similar positions, and therefore does not include women monarchs and regents.

== China ==
- Fu Shanxiang

== Europe ==
- Ottilie Pohl
- Ingibjörg H. Bjarnason
- Kristín Bjarnadóttir
- Þórunn Jónassen
- Suzanne Voilquin
- Léonie Rouzade
- Blanche Lefebvre
- Mary Clifford
- Anna Boschek
- Cornélie Huygens
- Elisabeth Dmitrieff
- Désirée Gay
- Joana Griniuvienė
- Jaquette Liljencrantz
- Gunhild Ziener

== India ==
- Mah Laqa Bai
- Jhalkaribai
- Annie Besant

== United States ==
- Julia Addington
- Martha Hughes Cannon
- Susanna M. Salter
- Elizabeth Yates (mayor)
