= Irina Schrotter =

Romanian fashion designer (born 1965)

- Born: 1965 (age 60–61); Iași, Romania
- Citizenship: Romanian
- Occupations: Fashion designer businessperson

Irina Schrotter (born 1965 in Iași) is a Romanian fashion designer and businessperson.

== Early life ==
She studied to become a physician, but in 1990, one year after graduating, she decided to go into the fashion business. In 2008, her company employed 1,000 people. In the same year, her main brand had revenues of 3.5 million euros, but dropped to 2.5 million euros after the financial crisis hit Romania in 2009. According to a 2013 article in Der Tagesspiegel, she is "Romania's most successful fashion designer". She participated in the Berlin Fashion Week in 2012 and 2013.

In 2008 she ran as an independent to become mayor of Iași, but withdrew her candidacy before the election.
