= List of Women's British Open champions =

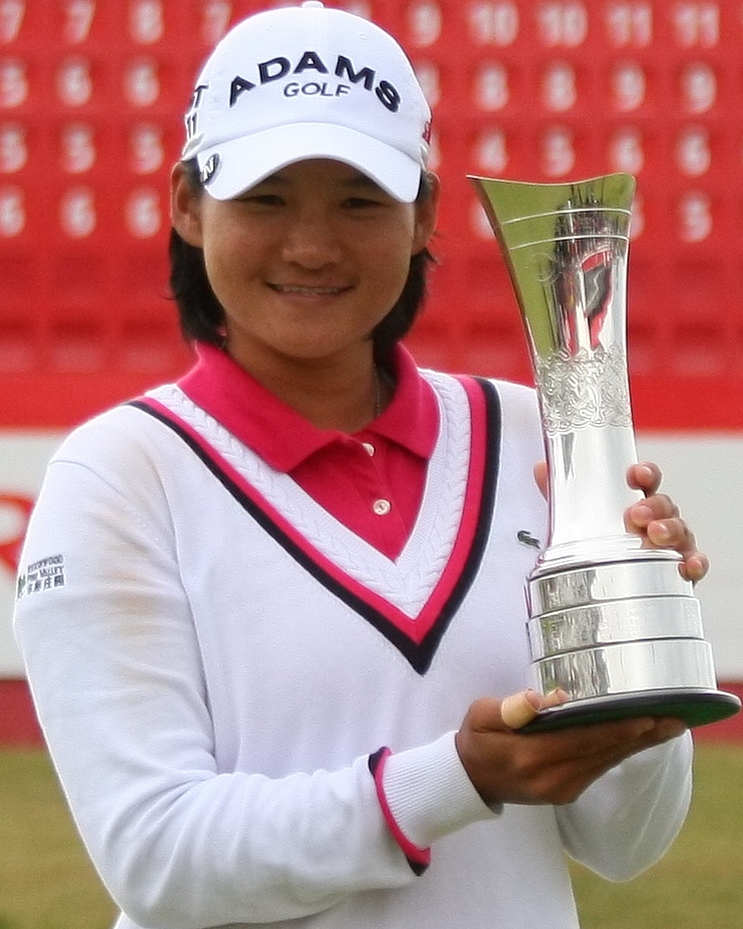
Yani Tseng, the only golfer to date to win two Women's British Opens as a major championship consecutively in 2010 and 2011. Tseng is pictured with the championship trophy.

The Women's British Open^{[a]} is an annual golf competition held at the end of July start of August, and is conducted by the R&A. Established in 1976, it has been recognised as a major championship by the Ladies European Tour (LET) since 1992, became a recognised LPGA event in 1994, and became one of the LPGA's major championships in 2001. As of 2021 it is the fifth and last of the LPGA's five majors, preceded by the Chevron Championship (formerly Kraft Nabisco Championship), U.S. Women's Open, the Women's PGA Championship and the Evian Championship (formerly Evian Masters). This event has always been conducted in stroke play competition.

Yani Tseng's victories in 2010 and 2011 and Jiyai Shin's in 2008 and 2012 make them the only two golfers to win the event twice since it became an LPGA major. The only other golfers to successfully defend their titles are Debbie Massey in 1980 and 1981, before the tournament became a part of the LPGA tour, and Sherri Steinhauer in 1998 and 1999, when it was a sanctioned LPGA event but not yet a major.

The lowest winning score in the tournament's history as an LPGA major is Karen Stupples's 19-under par 269 aggregate in 2004, equalling the record score set by Karrie Webb in 1997. The Women's British Open has had two wire-to-wire champions as a major: Jang Jeong in 2005 and Lorena Ochoa in 2007.

== Key ==
†	Tournament won in a playoff
‡	Wire-to-wire victory (as a major)

== Champions ==
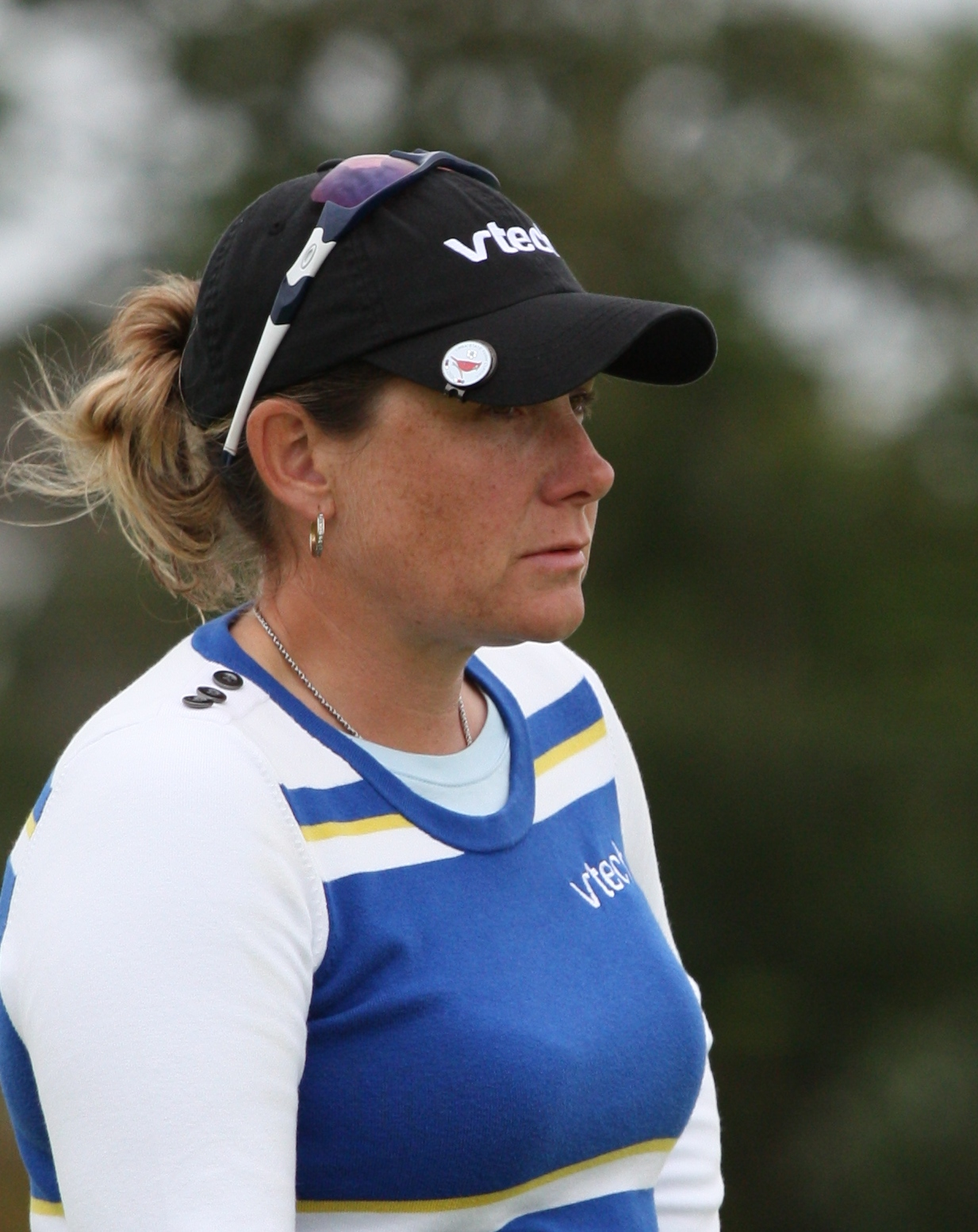
Karen Stupples won in 2004 by the lowest score.

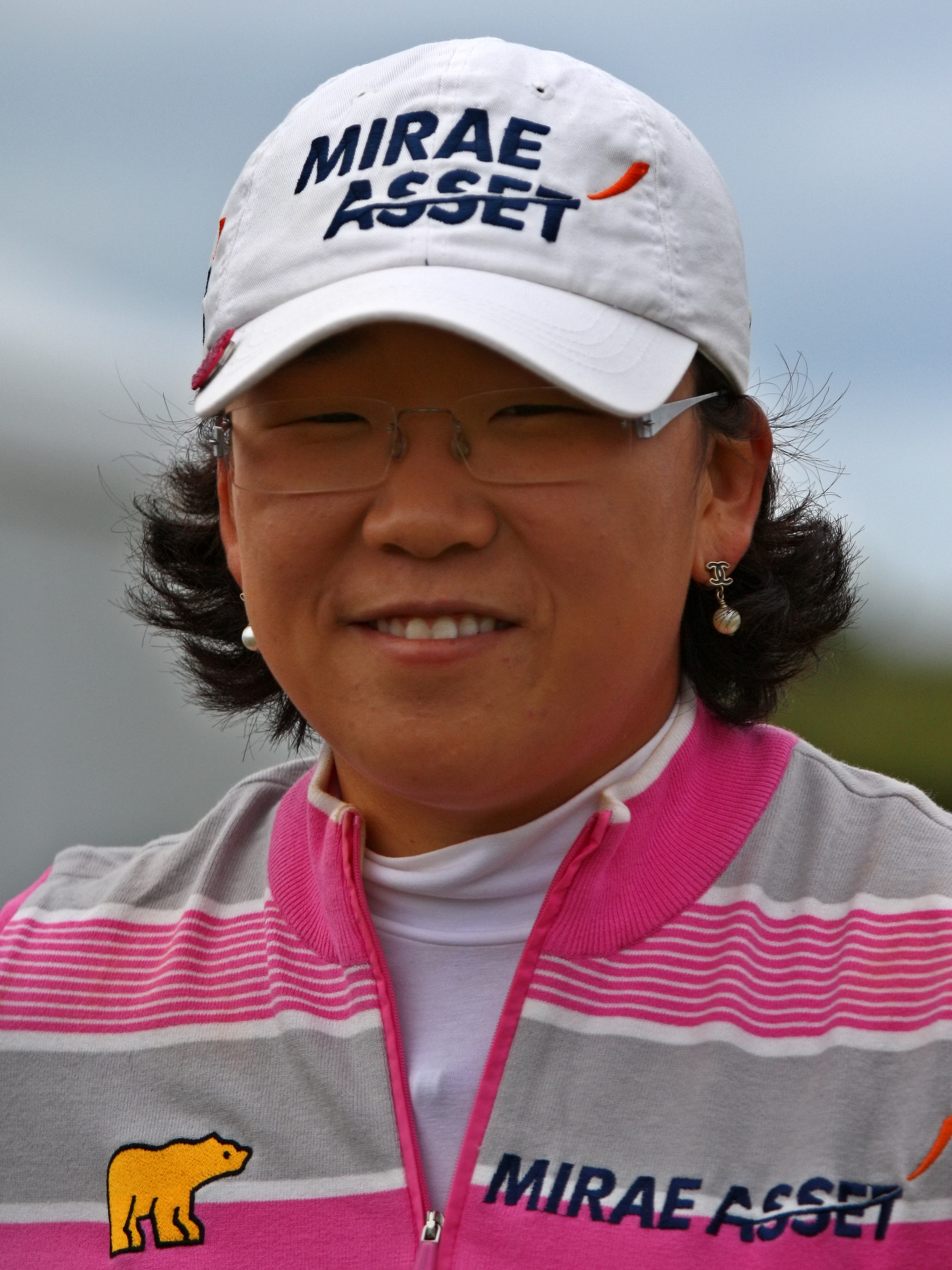
Jiyai Shin won by the widest margin of nine strokes in 2012, and is a two-time champion.

Year	Country	Champion	Course	City	Region	Country	Total score	To par	Notes
2001	South Korea	Se Ri Pak	Sunningdale Golf Club	Sunningdale	Berkshire	England	277	−11	
2002	Australia	Karrie Webb	Turnberry Golf Club, Ailsa Course	South Ayrshire	Ayrshire	Scotland	273	−15	
2003	Sweden	Annika Sörenstam	Royal Lytham & St Annes G.C.	Lytham St Annes	Lancashire	England	278	−10	
2004	England	Karen Stupples	Sunningdale Golf Club	Sunningdale	Berkshire	England	269	−19	
2005‡	South Korea	Jeong Jang	Royal Birkdale Golf Club	Southport	Merseyside	England	272	−16	
2006	United States	Sherri Steinhauer	Royal Lytham & St Annes G.C.	Lytham St Annes	Lancashire	England	281	−7	
2007‡	Mexico	Lorena Ochoa	Old Course at St Andrews	St Andrews	Fife	Scotland	287	−5	
2008	South Korea	Jiyai Shin	Sunningdale Golf Club	Sunningdale	Berkshire	England	270	−18	
2009	Scotland	Catriona Matthew	Royal Lytham & St Annes G.C.	Lytham St Annes	Lancashire	England	285	−3	
2010	Taiwan	Yani Tseng	Royal Birkdale Golf Club	Southport	Merseyside	England	277	−11	
2011	Taiwan	Yani Tseng	Carnoustie Golf Links	Carnoustie	Angus	Scotland	272	−16	
2012	South Korea	Jiyai Shin	Royal Liverpool Golf Club	Hoylake	Merseyside	England	279	−9	
2013	United States	Stacy Lewis	Old Course at St Andrews	St Andrews	Fife	Scotland	280	−8	
2014	United States	Mo Martin	Royal Birkdale Golf Club	Southport	Merseyside	England	287	−1	
2015	South Korea	Inbee Park	Trump Turnberry	South Ayrshire	Ayrshire	Scotland	276	−12	
2016	Thailand	Ariya Jutanugarn	Woburn	Milton Keynes	Buckinghamshire	England	272	−16	
2017	South Korea	In-Kyung Kim	Kingsbarns	Fife	Fife	Scotland	270	−18	
2018	England	Georgia Hall	Royal Lytham & St Annes G.C.	Lytham St Annes	Lancashire	England	271	−17	
2019	Japan	Hinako Shibuno	Woburn	Milton Keynes	Buckinghamshire	England	270	−18	
2020	Germany	Sophia Popov	Royal Troon	Troon	South Ayrshire	Scotland	277	−7	
2021	Sweden	Anna Nordqvist	Carnoustie Golf Links	Carnoustie	Angus	Scotland	276	−12	
2022	South Africa	Ashleigh Buhai	Muirfield Golf Links	Gullane	East Lothian	Scotland	274	−10	
2023	United States	Lilia Vu	Walton Heath Golf Club	Surrey	South East	England	274	−14	
2024	New Zealand	Lydia Ko	Old Course at St Andrews	St Andrews	Fife	Scotland	281	−7	
2025	Japan	Miyū Yamashita	Royal Porthcawl Golf Club	Porthcawl		Wales	277	−14	
2026	Japan	Shiho Kuwaki	Royal Lytham & St Annes G.C.	Lytham St Annes	Lancashire	England	279	−5	

== Multiple champions ==
This table lists the golfers who have won more than one Women's British Open as a major. Champions who won in consecutive years are indicated by the years with italics*.

Key

1	First place

Rank	Country	Golfer	Total	Years
1	Taiwan	Yani Tseng	2	2010*, 2011*
1	South Korea	Jiyai Shin	2	2008, 2012

== Champions by nationality ==
This table lists the total number of titles won by golfers of each nationality as an LPGA major (2001–present).

Rank	Nationality	Wins	Champions	First title	Last title
1	South Korea	6	5	2001	2017
2	United States	4	4	2006	2023
3	Japan	3	3	2019	2026
T4	England	2	2	2004	2018
T4	Sweden	2	2	2003	2021
T4	Taiwan	2	1	2010	2011
T7	Australia	1	1	2002	
T7	Germany	1	1	2020	
T7	Mexico	1	1	2007	
T7	New Zealand	1	1	2024	
T7	Scotland	1	1	2009	
T7	South Africa	1	1	2022	
T7	Thailand	1	1	2016	

== Notes ==
^{a} This tournament has had several names, which are the following; 2001–2006: Weetabix Women's British Open, 2007–2018: Ricoh Women's British Open, 2019: AIG Women's British Open, 2020–present AIG Women's Open.

== See also ==
- Chronological list of LPGA major golf champions
- List of LPGA major championship winning golfers
- Grand Slam (golf)
