= Ann Taylor (newscaster) =

American newscaster

Ann Taylor (born April 27, 1936, in Johnson City, Tennessee) is a newscaster who reported for National Public Radio (NPR), contributing to All Things Considered from 1989 to 2011. Her questions at presidential press conferences always started with "This is Ann Taylor" in her signature voice.

== Biography ==
In 1949, Taylor and her family moved to Knoxville, Tennessee as her father was appointed to become a federal judge by U.S. President Harry S. Truman. She graduated from West High School and Chatham Hall.

She graduated from Chatham Hall and attended Sweet Briar College, before transferring to and graduating from the University of Tennessee in Knoxville, where she majored in English and minored in history.

She was a newscaster for WATE in Knoxville and WTOP in Washington, D.C., prior to joining NBC. She worked for NBC for 15 years, and at NPR for 21 years.

Taylor is the daughter of Florence McCain and Judge Robert L. Taylor.

== Awards and honors ==
She was awarded the Gabriel Certificate of Merit. She was also a 1996 Notable University of Tennessee Woman Award Recipient and in 1979 an American Women in Radio and Television commendation for "The Women's Program."
