= List of women film score composers =

The following is a list of female film score composers.

- Anita Andreis, Croatian
- Pilar Onares, Spain
- Rachita Arora, Indian
- Malini Awasthi, Indian
- Lesley Barber (born 1962), Canadian
- Elsa Barraine (1910–1999), French
- Bebe Barron (born 1926), American
- P. Bhanumathi (1925–2005), Indian
- Bhavatharini, Indian
- Björk (born 1965), Icelandic
- Kathryn Bostic, American
- Joanna Bruzdowicz (born 1943), Polish
- Wendy Carlos (born 1939), American
- Doreen Carwithen (1922–2003), British
- Suzanne Ciani (born 1946), American
- Dolores Claman (1927–2021), Canadian
- Siobhán Cleary (born 1970), Irish
- Lisa Coleman (born 1960), American
- Miriam Cutler, American
- Evelyne Datl, Canadian
- Alokananda Dasgupta, Indian
- Andrea Datzman (born 1980), American
- Payal Dev, Indian
- Saraswati Devi, Indian
- Sussan Deyhim (born 1958), Iranian
- Michelle DiBucci (born 1961), American
- Violeta Dinescu (born 1953), Romanian
- Elizabeth Drake, Australian
- Anne Dudley (born 1956), English
- Sharon Farber, Israeli
- Samantha Fonti (born 1973), Australian
- Felicity Fox, Australian
- Germaine Franco (born 1987), American
- Lisa Gerrard (born 1961), Australian
- Julie Giroux (born 1961), American
- Sofia Gubaidulina (born 1931), Russian
- Hildur Guðnadóttir (born 1982), Icelandic
- Dulcie Holland (1913–2000), Australian
- Natalie Holt, British
- Jaddan Bai, Indian
- Yoko Kanno (born 1963), Japanese
- Kanika Kapoor, Indian/British
- Eleni Karaindrou (born 1941), Greek
- Laura Karpman (born 1959), American
- Shibani Kashyap, Indian
- Elena Kats-Chernin, (born 1957), Australian
- Victoria Kelly, New Zealand
- Usha Khanna, Indian
- Sneha Khanwalkar, Indian
- Morgan Kibby (born 1984), American
- Samira Koppikar, Indian
- Penka Kouneva (born 1967), Bulgarian-American
- Vivian Kubrick (born 1960), American
- Runa Laila (born 1952), Bangladeshi
- Gowry Lekshmi (born 1993), Indian
- Mica Levi, British
- Deborah Lurie (born 1974), American
- Elisabeth Lutyens (1906–1983), English
- Lata Mangeshkar (1929–2022), Indian
- Meena Mangeshkar (born 1931), Indian
- Noriko Matsueda (born 1971), Japanese
- Wendy Melvoin (born 1964), American
- Nami Melumad (born 1988), Israeli-Dutch
- Anna Meredith (born 1978), Scottish
- Angela Morley (1924–2009), English
- Rika Muranaka, Japanese
- Jennie Muskett, British
- Selma Mutal, Franco-Dutch
- Olga Neuwirth (born 1968), Austrian
- Nora Orlandi (born 1933), Italian
- Michiru Ōshima, Japanese
- Christine Ott (born 1963), French
- Starr Parodi, American
- Jocelyn Pook (born 1960), English
- Rachel Portman (born 1960), English
- Ferdousi Rahman (born 1941), Bangladeshi
- A. R. Reihana, Indian
- Diana Ringo (born 1992), Finnish
- Lolita Ritmanis (born 1962), Latvian-American
- Ann Ronell (1905–1993), American
- Laura Rossi, British
- Jasleen Royal, Indian
- Sandrine Rudaz, Swiss French
- Sarah Schachner (born 1988), American
- Gaili Schoen, American
- Michelle Scullion (born 1957), New Zealand
- Ilona Sekacz (born 1948), British
- Neeta Sen, Indian
- Anoushka Shankar, Indian/American
- Chitra Singh, Indian
- Maribeth Solomon (born 1950), Canadian
- Laurie Spiegel (born 1945), American
- M. M. Srilekha, Indian
- Peggy Stuart Coolidge (1913–1981), American
- Meenakshi Subramanyam, Indian
- Germaine Tailleferre (1892–1983), French
- Parampara Thakur, Indian
- Katia Tchemberdji (born 1960), Russian
- Jennifer Thomas (pianist) (born 1977), American
- Pinar Toprak (born 1980), Turkish-American
- Nerida Tyson-Chew (born 1965), Australian
- Shirley Walker (1945–2006), American
- Amelia Warner (born 1982), English
- Debbie Wiseman (born 1963), British
- Jill Wisoff (born 1956), American
- Caitlin Yeo, Australian
- Shimul Yousuf, Bangladeshi
