= Clara database =

Database of women artists

The Clara database of women artists was a database named after Clara Peeters that was created and operated by the National Museum of Women in the Arts. It contained biographical information on 18,000 women visual artists of all time periods and nationalities. The information was drawn primarily from materials in NMWA's own archives, but various portraits used to document the entries were obtained from other libraries in the NMWA's network. The Clara database was maintained from 2008 to 2012 but is no longer being updated. It is accessible on the Wayback Machine. Some of the artist profiles from the database are now a featured component on the NMWA website.

The name was chosen because two of Clara's works that had been purchased by Wilhelmina Holladay formed the beginning of the museum's collection.
