= List of women role-playing game professionals =

This is a list of female individuals that have worked professionally in the field of creating role-playing games, including designers, editors, and artists.

== A ==
- Avery Alder
- Erica Awano

== B ==
- Meguey Baker
- Donna Barr
- Linda M. Bingle
- Jean Blashfield Black
- Emily Care Boss
- Anne Brown - Writer/Editor/Game Designer
- Jennifer Brozek - Writer/Game Designer/Editor

== C ==
- Michele Carter
- Banana Chan
- Deborah Teramis Christian
- Genevieve Cogman
- Sue Weinlein Cook

== D ==
- Liz Danforth
- Ann Dupuis - President of Grey Ghost Games/Writer/Game Designer

== F ==
- Emily Fiegenschuh
- Crystal Frasier

== G ==
- Lee Gold
- Rebecca Guay

== H ==
- Jess Hartley - Novelist/Writer/Developer/Editor
- Andria Hayday
- Jennifer Hepler
- Carol Heyer
- Laura Hickman
- Miranda Horner
- Heather Hudson

== J ==
- Jennell Jaquays
- Kij Johnson
- Veronica V. Jones

== K ==
- Katharine Kerr
- Heike Kubasch

== L ==
- Laura Lakey
- Stephanie Pui-Mun Law
- April Lee
- Jody Lee
- Nicole Lindroos
- Stacy Longstreet

== M ==
- Diana Magnuson
- Julia Martin
- Angel Leigh McCoy
- Elizabeth McCoy
- Anne Gray McCready
- Wynn Mercere
- Jenna K. Moran - (formerly Rebecca Sean Borgstrom)
- Rowena Morrill

== N ==
- Sarah Newton
- Terese Nielsen
- Kate Novak

== P ==
- Darlene Pekul
- Jessica Price

== R ==
- Jean Rabe
- Alex Roberts (game designer)

== S ==
- Jeeyon Shim
- Lisa Smedman
- Caroline Spector
- Lisa J. Steele
- Lisa Stevens
- Anne Stokes

== T ==
- Cat Tobin

== V ==
- Monica Valentinelli
- Valerie Valusek
- Susan Van Camp

== W ==
- Sue Weinlein Cook
- Margaret Weis - TSR's Dragonlance and MWP's Serenity
- Jean Wells
- Eva Widermann
- Robin Wood
- Teeuwynn Woodruff
- Janny Wurts

== Y ==
- Barbara G. Young
