= List of current WNBA head coaches =

This is a list of current Women's National Basketball Association head coaches.

== Coaches ==
Yrs	Years coached
GC	Games coached
W	Wins
L	Losses
W–L %	Win–loss percentage

Note: Coaching records are correct through 2026 regular season.

Conference	Team	Coach	Since	Team							Career						
Conference	Team	Coach	Since	Regular season				Postseason			Regular season				Postseaon		
Conference	Team	Coach	Since	Yrs	GC	W–L	W–L%	GC	W–L	W–L%	Yrs	GC	W–L	W–L%	GC	W–L	W–L%
Eastern	Atlanta Dream	Karl Smesko	November 13, 2024	2	88	60–28	.682	3	1–2	.333	2	88	60–28	.682	3	1–2	.333
Eastern	Chicago Sky	Tyler Marsh	November 3, 2024	2	88	26–62	.295	0	0–0	–	2	88	26–62	.295	0	0–0	–
Eastern	Connecticut Sun	Rachid Meziane	December 4, 2024	2	88	22–66	.250	0	0–0	–	2	88	22–66	.250	0	0–0	–
Eastern	Indiana Fever	Stephanie White	November 1, 2024	4	156	89–67	.571	20	10–10	.500	6	236	144–92	.610	34	17–17	.500
Eastern	New York Liberty	Vacant	November 3, 2026	0	0	0–0	–	0	0–0	–	0	0	0–0	–	0	0–0	–
Eastern	Toronto Tempo	Sandy Brondello	October 22, 2025	1	44	11–33	.250	0	0–0	–	14	494	280–214	.567	72	40–32	.556
Eastern	Washington Mystics	Sydney Johnson	December 23, 2024	2	88	44–44	.500	0	0–0	–	2	88	44–44	.500	0	0–0	–
Western	Dallas Wings	Jose Fernandez	October 23, 2025	1	44	27–17	.614	0	0–0	–	1	44	27–17	.614	0	0–0	–
Western	Golden State Valkyries	Natalie Nakase	October 10, 2024	2	88	55–33	.625	2	0–2	.000	2	88	55–33	.625	2	0–2	.000
Western	Las Vegas Aces	Becky Hammon	December 31, 2021	5	204	148–56	.725	37	28–9	.757	5	204	148–56	.725	37	28–9	.757
Western	Los Angeles Sparks	Vacant	September 25, 2026	0	0	0–0	–	0	0–0	–	0	0	0–0	–	0	0–0	–
Western	Minnesota Lynx	Cheryl Reeve	December 8, 2009	17	598	397–201	.664	83	52–31	.627	17	598	397–201	.664	83	52–31	.627
Western	Phoenix Mercury	Nate Tibbetts	October 18, 2023	3	128	62–66	.484	13	5–8	.385	3	128	62–66	.484	13	5–8	.385
Western	Portland Fire	Alex Sarama	October 17, 2025	1	44	17–27	.386	0	0–0	–	1	44	17–27	.386	0	0–0	–
Western	Seattle Storm	Sonia Raman	October 24, 2025	1	44	8–36	.182	0	0–0	–	1	44	8–36	.182	0	0–0	–
