= List of Macedonian women artists =

This is a list of women artists who were born in Macedonia or whose artworks are closely associated with that country.

== D ==
- Iskra Dimitrova (born 1965), multimedia artist

== H ==
- Elpida Hadzi-Vasileva (born 1971), installation artist, based in the UK
- Maja Hill (born 1976), painter, based in the UK

== V ==
- Keraca Visulčeva (1911–2004), painter
