= List of Icelandic women artists =

This is a list of women artists who were born in Iceland or whose artworks are closely associated with that country.

== A ==
- Anna Jóelsdóttir (born 1947), contemporary artist

== E ==
- Erla S. Haraldsdóttir (born 1967), visual artist

== G ==
- Gabríela Friðriksdóttir (born 1971), painter, sculptor
- Gunnhildur Hauksdóttir (born 1972), visual artist
- Gerður Helgadóttir (1928–1975), sculptor, stained-glass artist
- Gunnfríður Jónsdóttir (1889–1968), sculptor

== J ==
- Júlíana Sveinsdóttir (1889–1966), early female painter, textile artist

== K ==
- Katrín Sigurdardóttir (born 1967), sculptor and installation artist
- Kristín Jónsdóttir (1888–1959), pioneering female painter
- Kristín Ragna Gunnarsdóttir (born 1968), children's book writer and illustrator

== L ==
- Louisa Matthíasdóttir (1917–2000), Icelandic-American painter

== M ==
- Margret the Adroit (early 13th century), carver

== N ==
- Nína Sæmundsson (1892–1965), sculptor, painter
- Nína Tryggvadóttir (1913–1968), abstract expressionist artist

== T ==
- Þorbjörg Pálsdóttir (1919–2009), sculptor
