= List of Jamaican women artists =

This is a list of women artists who were born in Jamaica or whose artworks are closely associated with that country.

== A ==
- Pearl Alcock (1934–2006), outsider artist
- Esther Anderson (born 1946), filmmaker, photographer, actress

== B ==
- Jacqueline Bishop, writer, visual artist and photographer
- Hope Brooks (born 1944), painter

== C ==
- Margaret Chen (born 1951), sculptor
- Renée Cox (born 1960), artist, photographer, curator, feminist, now in New York
- Tessanne Chin (born 1985), youth mentor, philanthropist, visual artist
- Tami Chynn (born 1983), fashion designer, vlogger
- Naomi Cowan (born 1994) artist, actress
- Yvonne Curtis (date of birth not publicly disclosed)
- Cecile (born 1974)

== E ==
- Gloria Escoffery (1923–2002), painter, poet, critic

== F ==
- Elsie Few (1909–1980), painter, art teacher

== G ==
- Marguerite Primrose Gerrard (1922–1993), botanical artist
- Lorna Goodison (born 1947), writer and painter

== M ==
- Tamara Natalie Madden (1975–2017), Jamaican-American painter
- Edna Manley (1900–1987), sculptor
- Petrona Morrison (born 1954), sculptor

== P ==
- Ebony Patterson (born 1981), mixed-media artist
