= List of Bosnia and Herzegovina women artists =

This is a list of women artists who were born in Bosnia and Herzegovina or whose artworks are closely associated with that country.

== A ==
- Azra Aksamija (active since c. 2000), artist, architectural historian

== H ==
- Nela Hasanbegović (born 1984), sculptor

== J ==
- Adela Jusic (born 1982), contemporary artist

== K ==
- Šejla Kamerić (born 1976), contemporary artist
- Helena Klakocar (born 1958), alternative cartoonist
- Maya Kulenovic (born 1975), Yugoslavian-born Canadian painter

== M ==
- Ksenia Milicevic (born 1942), Yugoslavian-born French painter

== S ==
- Alma Selimovic (born 1981), mixed media art works and fibreglass sculptures
