= List of Serbian women artists =

This is a list of women artists who were born in Serbia or whose artworks are closely associated with that country.

== B ==
- Ana Bešlić (1912–2008), sculptor
- Kossa Bokchan (1925–2009), painter

== C ==
- Zuzana Chalupová (1925–2001), naïve painter

== D ==
- Jasmina Đokić (born 1970), painter

== I ==
- Tatjana Ilić (born 1966), painter
- Mirjana Isaković, sculptor and ceramist
- Olja Ivanjicki (1931–2009), contemporary artist
- Katarina Ivanović (1811–1882), painter

== J ==
- Olga Jančić (1929–2012), sculptor
- Olga Jevrić (1922–2014), sculptor
- Ljubinka Jovanović (1922–2015), painter

== K ==
- Mina Karadžić (1828–1894), painter
- Irena Kazazić (born 1972), painter

== O ==
- Tanja Ostojić (born 1972), feminist performance artist

== P ==
- Milena Pavlović-Barili (1909–1945), painter
- Nadežda Petrović (1873–1915), painter
- Zora Petrović (1894–1962), painter

== R ==
- Simonida Rajčević (born 1974), painter
- Drinka Radovanović (born 1943), sculptor
- Eva Ras (born 1941), actress, writer, painter

== S ==
- Ljubica Sokić (1914–2009), painter
- Jovanka Stanojević (born 1979), painter
- Slobodanka Stupar (born 1947), visual artist

== T ==
- Milica Tomić (born 1960), contemporary artist
- Poleksija Todorović (1848–1939), painter

== V ==
- Draginja Vlasic (1928–2011), painter
- Beta Vukanović (1872–1972), painter
