= List of women in leadership =

The following is a list of women in leadership by nationality – notable women who are well known for their achievements in leadership.

== Africa ==
=== Kenya ===
- Vivienne Yeda Apopo, banker, director general of the East African Development Bank
- Gina Din (born 1961), businesswoman working in strategic communication and public relations
- Tabitha Karanja (born 1964), entrepreneur, CEO of Keroche Breweries
- Stella Kilonzo (born 1975), former CEO of Capital Markets Authority (Kenya), manager at the African Development Bank

=== Morocco ===
- Salwa Idrissi Akhannouch, businesswoman, founder and CEO of the Aksai Group with retail interests

=== Namibia ===
- Clara Bohitile (born 1955), politician, businesswoman, chair of the Meat Corporation of Namibia
- Monica Nashandi (born 1959), former diplomat and politician, former High Commissioner to the United Kingdom
- Inge Zaamwani-Kamwi (born 1958), former government minister, former managing director of the Namdeb mining joint venture

=== Nigeria ===
- Olajumoke Adenowo (born 1968), architect, businesswoman, head of the oil and gas firm Advantage Energy, founder of AD Consulting
- Folorunsho Alakija (born 1951), business tycoon in the fashion, oil and printing industries
- Folake Coker (born 1974), fashion designer, founder of Tiffany Amber
- Uche Eze (born 1983), social media expert, entrepreneur, founder of the BellaNaija online magazine
- Kehinde Kamson (born 1961), entrepreneur, founder and CEO of the fast food company Sweet Sensation Confectionery
- Abibatu Mogaji (1917–2013), business magnate, President-General, Association of Nigerian Market Women and Men
- Ndidi Okonkwo Nwuneli (born 1975), social entrepreneur, co-founder of AACE Food Processing & Distribution, founder of LEAD Africa, a non-profit enterprise encouraging business leadership and development
- Bola Shagaya (born 1959), businesswoman, managing director of Practoil, board member of Unity Bank, Nigeria

=== Sierra Leone ===
- Isha Johansen, since 2013, president of the Sierra Leone Football Association
- Asma Mansour (born mid-1990s), entrepreneur, co-founded Tunisian Center for Social Entrepreneurship in 2011

=== South Africa ===
- Judy Dlamini (born 1959), businesswoman, author, Chancellor of the University of the Witwatersrand and the founding chairman of Mbekani Group
- Mpho Tshivhase (born 1986) philosopher at the University of Pretoria

=== Uganda ===
- Barbara Birungi, technologist, founder of HiveColab
- Amina Moghe Hersi (born 1963), business executive in Kampala
- Annet Nakawunde Mulindwa, managing director and chair of Finance Trust Bank

== Asia-Pacific ==
=== Afghanistan ===
- Fatema Akbari, founded the Women Affairs Council in 2004
- Roya Mahboob, founder and CEO of Afghan Citadel Software

=== Australia ===
- Rosie Batty (born 1962), Australian of the Year (2015)
- Julie Bishop (born 1956), foreign minister since 2013
- Jillian Broadbent (born 1948), business executive, board member of the Reserve Bank of Australia, chancellor of the University of Wollongong
- Elizabeth Broderick, former Australian Federal Sex Discrimination Commissioner
- Dame Quentin Alice Louise Bryce (born 1942), Governor-General of Australia (2008–2014)
- Ita Buttrose (born 1942), journalist, businesswoman, former editor of the Australian Women's Weekly, President of Alzheimers Australia
- Kate Carnell (born 1955), former Chief Minister of the Australian Capital Territory, CEO of the Australian Chamber of Commerce and Industry
- Kathryn Fagg, prominent businesswoman, board member of the Reserve Bank of Australia
- Julia Gillard (born 1961), prime minister (2010–2013)
- Kay Goldsworthy (born 1956), Archbishop of Perth and Metropolitan of the Province of Western Australia in the Anglican Church of Australia
- Carolyn Hewson, prominent businesswoman
- Cindy Hook, CEO, Deloitte Australia
- Joan Kirner (1938–2015), politician, 42nd Premier of Victoria
- Catherine Livingstone (born 1955), chair of the Business Council of Australia (2014)
- Tanya Plibersek (born 1969), former Deputy Leader of the Australian Labor Party and former and current Cabinet Minister.
- Heather Ridout (born 1954), businesswoman, chair of Australian Super, board member of the Reserve Bank of Australia
- Gina Rinehart (born 1954), mining magnate, chair of Hancock Prospecting
- Gillian Triggs (born 1945), president, Australian Human Rights Commission
- Alison Watkins, CEO, Coca-Cola Amatil Australia
- Jennifer Westacott, CEO, Business Council of Australia

=== Bangladesh ===
- Begum Khaleda Zia (1953–2007), Prime Minister of Bangladesh

=== China ===
- Margaret Chan (born 1947), Chinese (Hong Kong) health specialist, director-general of the World Health Organization
- Dong Mingzhu, business executive, president of Gree Electric
- Ping Fu, Chinese-American entrepreneur, founder of Geomagic
- Gu Kailai (born 1958), former lawyer, businesswoman
- Liu Chaoying (born 1950s), former executive at China Aerospace International Holdings, Lt. Col in the People's Liberation Army
- Peng Lei, co-founder and executive of Alibaba Group
- Zihan Ling, entrepreneur and gender equality proponent, founded Techbase in 2015
- Sheng Aiyi (1900–1983), entertainment entrepreneur, general manager of Shanghai BaiLeMen
- Wu Ying (born 1981), former entrepreneur, convicted of fraud
- Yang Huiyan (born 1981), majority shareholder of the Country Garden Holdings property group
- Yang Lan (born 1986), co-founder and chair of Sun Media Group
- Peggy Yu (born 1965), co-founder of Dangdang, an online retailer
- Zhang Xin (born 1965), business executive, co-founder and CEO of the real estate developer SOHO China
- Zhang Yin (born 1957), founder and director of Nine Dragons Paper Holdings Limited
- Kelly Zong (born 1982), executive and purchasing manager of the Hangzhou Wahaha beverage group

=== Hong Kong ===
- Sally Aw (born 1926), newspaper owner until 1959
- Flora Cheong-Leen (born 1959), business executive in fashion
- Pollyanna Chu, executive with interests in finance and real estate
- Lydia Dunn, Baroness Dunn (born 1940), business executive, former politician, held senior positions until 1995
- Kwong Siu-hing (born 1929), controlling interests in Sun Hung Kai Properties
- Michelle Sun, entrepreneur, founded First Code Academy in 2013
- Yvonne Lui (born 1977), business executive, board member of several companies
- Annie Wu, businesswoman, founder of Beijing Air Catering, involved in other catering joint ventures

=== India ===
- Anuradha Acharya (born 1972), entrepreneur, founder and CEO of Ocimum Bio Solutions
- Vinita Bali (born 1955), CEO of the food products corporation Britannia Industries
- Avani Davda (born c.1980), CEO of the joint venture between Starbucks and Tata Global Beverage
- Nisa Godrej, executive director of Godrej Consumer Products
- Shyamala Gopinath (born 1949), former deputy governor of the Reserve Bank of India, chair of HDFC Bank
- Vandana Luthra (born 1959), entrepreneur, founder of VLCC Health Care Ltd
- Kiran Mazumdar-Shaw (born 1953), chair and CEO of Biocon
- Sumati Morarjee (1907–1998), headed the Scindia Steam Navigation Company
- Leena Nair (born 1969), executive director, HR, Hindustan Unilever
- Naveen Saini (born 1958), business executive, former CEO of ICICI Prudential, CEO of Oral Developers bank
- Sheila Sri Prakash (born 1955), Founder and Chief Architect of Shilpa Architects, Board Member of the Chennai Smart Cities Ltd., Member of World Economic Forum’s Global Agenda Council on Design Innovation, Role of Arts in Society, and the Future Council on Sustainability and Resource Scarcity
- Priya Paul (born 1967), Chairperson of Apeejay Surrendra Park Hotels (born 1967), chair of Apeejay Surrendra Park Hotels
- Chitra Ramkrishna (born 1963), managing director and CEO, National Stock Exchange of India
- Kirthiga Reddy (born c.1972), businesswomen, director of sales at Facebook India
- Nicole Rodrigues-Larsen (born 1973), Dubai-based entrepreneur, founder and managing director of modelling and talent agencies
- Usha Sangwan, business executive, managing director of Life Insurance Corporation of India
- Devita Saraf (born 1981), founder and CEO of Vu Technologies
- Ameera Shah (born 1979), CEO and Managing Director, Metropolis Healthcare
- Shikha Sharma (born 1958), managing director and CEO of Axis Bank
- Snehlata Shrivastava (born 1957), government administrator, business executive, board member of National Bank for Agriculture and Rural Development
- Mallika Srinivasan (born 1959), chair and CEO of the TAFE farm equipment company
- Mercy Williams (c.1947–2014), first woman to be mayor of Kochi

=== Indonesia ===
- Karen Agustiawan (born 1958), former managing director and CEO of the Pertamina oil and gas concern
- Megawati Sukarnoputri (born 1947), politician, President of Indonesia (2001–2004)
- Mooryati Soedibyo (1928–2024), politician, entrepreneur, founder and owner of Mustika Ratu cosmetics
- Sri Mulyani Indrawati (born 1962), former Managing Director of the World Bank Group, Minister of Finance of Indonesia
- Susi Pudjiastuti (born 1965), owner of Susi Air and PT ASI Pudjiastuti Marine Product, Minister of Maritime Affairs and Fisheries of Indonesia
- Tri Rismaharini (born 1961), politician, Mayor of Surabaya

=== Israel ===
- Orit Adato (born 1955), first woman to achieve a three-star rank in Israel

=== Japan ===
- Tatsuuma Kiyo (1809–1900), leading role at the Hakushika sake brewing company
- Sadako Ogata (1927–2019), international political leader, widely known as the first woman to be appointed as head of the UNHCR (1990-2000)
- Fumiko Hayashi (born 1946), businessperson and politician, former president of BMW Tokyo, CEO of Daiei Inc., and Mayor of Yokohama

=== Malaysia ===
- Yvonne Chia (born c.1953), business executive, former CEO of Hong Leong Bank, currently CEO of Shell Refining, Malaysia
- Wan Azizah Wan Ismail (born c.1952), politician, former Deputy Prime Minister of Malaysia
- Rafidah Aziz, politician, Chairman of AirAsia X
- Muhaini Mahmud, co-founder of Kiddocare App
- Melissa Ngiam, COO of Yayasan Generasi Gemilang (GG)
- Jenn Low, founder of Wanderlust + Co
- Lovy Beh, Director of BP Healthcare Group
- Raeesa Sya, founder of Orkid Cosmetics

=== Nepal ===
- Maggie Shah, Jawalakhel Group of Industries

=== New Zealand ===
- Jacinda Ardern (born 1980), Prime Minister of New Zealand, former president of the International Union of Socialist Youth
- Theresa Gattung, business executive with senior positions in several companies including Bank of New Zealand and Telecom New Zealand
- Bronwen Holdsworth (born 1943), business woman, arts patron, chair of the Holdsworth Group with interests in farming, property, investment and manufacturing
- Pauline Kumeroa Kingi (born 1951), Māori community leader
- Rosanne Meo, board member of several companies including television energy and financial interests
- Annette Presley (born 1964), telecommunications entrepreneur, co-founder of Slingshot
- Nicky Wagner (born 1953), politician, government minister outside of cabinet
- Joan Withers, business executive, chair of Television New Zealand and the Mercury Energy electricity generation company

=== North Korea ===
- Kim Kyong-hui (born 1946), former member of the Central Committee of the Workers' Party of Korea, former director of WPK Light Industry Department

=== Pakistan ===
- Benazir Bhutto (1953–2007), Prime Minister of Pakistan
- Begum Kulsum Saifullah Khan (1924–2015), businessperson, politician, chair of the textile conglomerate Saif Group
- Fahmida Mirza (born 1956), politician, former speaker of the National Assembly of Pakistan

=== Philippines ===
- Patricia Santo Tomas, chair of the Development Bank of the Philippines

=== Saudi Arabia ===
- Nabilah al-Tunisi (born c.1959), general manager of Northern Area Projects for the Saudi Aramco oil and gas company
- Lubna Olayan (born 1955), influential businessperson, CEO of Olayan Financing Company
- Ameera al-Taweel (born 1983), princess, philanthropist, vice chairperson of Alwaleed Philanthropies

=== Singapore ===
- Jannie Chan, entrepreneur, president of the Singapore Retailers Association
- Jennie Chua, businessperson, co-founder of Beeworks, Inc.
- Fatimah binte Sulaiman (c.1754–c.1852), merchant, philanthropist
- Loke Cheng Kim (1895–1981), Malaysian-born businessperson, owner of the Ocean Park Hotel
- Olivia Lum, founder and president of the Hyflux Group
- Saw Phaik Hwa (born 1957), former president and CEO of SMRT Corporation

=== South Korea ===
- Kim Sung-joo (born 1956), entrepreneur, founder and CEO of Sungjoo Group, chair and CEO of MCM Holdings

=== Sri Lanka ===
- Neela Marikkar, chair of the Grant McCann Erickson advertising agency

=== Taiwan ===
- Nancy T. Chang (born 1950), biochemist, co-founder of the U.S. pharmaceutical company Tanox
- Eva Chen, business executive, co-founder and CEO of the Trend Micro security company
- Shenan Chuang, CEO for Greater China at the Ogilvy & Mather advertising and marketing company

=== Thailand ===
- Tarisa Watanagase (born 1949), economist, former governor of the Bank of Thailand

=== United Arab Emirates ===
- Raja Al Gurg, influential business executive, managing director of Easa Saleh Al Gurg

== Europe ==
=== Andorra ===
- Lídia Armengol i Vila (1948–1991), civil servant who championed the restoration of her country's historic language and culture

=== Armenia ===
- Matild Manukyan (1914–2001), leading property investor in Istanbul

=== Austria ===
- Evelyn Lauder (1936–2011), Austrian American business executive, vice president of Estée Lauder Companies
- Nadja Swarovski (born 1970), board member of the Swarovski crystal company

=== Belgium ===
- Clara de Hirsch (1833–1899), businesswoman, philanthropist
- Marie-Thérèse Rossel (1910–1987), newspaper editor, headed the Rossel publishing company

=== Croatia ===
- Maja Ruth Frenkel, entrepreneur, business executive, politician

=== Czech Republic ===
- Muriel Anton, economist, business executive, former CEO of Vodafone, Czech Republic
- Olga Pelcova, designer, business executive, CEO of LUSSOLIBE Milano SE
- Maria-Elisabeth Schaeffler (born 1941), co-owner of the German Schaeffler Group manufacturer of rolling bearings

=== Denmark ===
- Birgit Aagard-Svendsen (born 1956), executive vice president and CFO of the J. Lauritzen shipping company
- Stine Bosse (born 1960), business executive, positions with TrygVesta, Allianz, Aker and president of the Royal Danish Theatre
- Elsebeth Budolfsen (born 1947), pharmacist, business executive, has held senior positions in several important Danish companies
- Lene Dammand Lund (born 1963), architect, educator, rector at the Royal Danish Academy of Fine Arts
- Lene Espersen (born 1965), politician, business executive
- Julie Fagerholt (born 1968), fashion designer, founder of the luxury clothing brand Heartmade
- Mette Kynne Frandsen (born 1960), CEO and partner at Henning Larsen Architects
- Karen Hækkerup (born 1974), politician, business executive, former minister
- Vibeke Jensdatter (1638–1709), early merchant, landowner, successful in business
- Hanni Toosbuy Kasprzak (born 1957), owner and chair of the ECCO shoe company
- Camilla Ley Valentin (born 1973), business executive, co-founder and CCO of the queuing system Queue-it
- Dorte Mandrup (born 1961), architect, founder and owner of Dorte Mandrup Arkitekter
- Tine Roed (born 1964), administrator, business executive, deputy director-general at the Confederation of Danish Industries
- Lene Tranberg (born 1956), head and co-founder of Lundgaard & Tranberg
- Ane Mærsk Mc-Kinney Uggla (born 1948), business executive, chair of the A.P. Møller Foundation
- Margrethe Vestager (born 1968), Danish politician, European Commissioner for Competition
- Vibeke Windeløv (born 1950), film producer, has served on numerous corporate boards including the European Film Academy

=== Estonia ===
- Karoli Hindriks, entrepreneur
- Ester Tuiksoo, politician and business executive

=== Finland ===
- Lenita Airisto (born 1937), influential business leader, culture and TV
- Anne Brunila (born 1957), executive vice president of Fortum
- Maija-Liisa Friman (born 1952), business executive, serving on the board of several companies
- Valpuri Innamaa (died 1602), early merchant, shipowner
- Sveta Planman (born 1979), fashion designer, CEO of JOLIER
- Lisa Sounio (born 1970), fashion entrepreneur, business executive
- Jaana Tuominen (born 1960), business executive, CEO of the coffee and cocoa company Gustav Paulig

=== France ===
- Catherine Barba (born 1973), business executive active in digital retail
- Patricia Barbizet (born 1955), holds various executive positions including CEO of Christie's
- Suzanne Belperron (1900–1983), influential jewellery designer and business executive
- Liliane Bettencourt (1922–2017), prominent businesswoman, top shareholder in L'Oréal
- Anne Bouverot (born 1966), business executive, CEO of Morpho, former board member of the GSM Association
- Coco Chanel (1883–1971), founder of Chanel
- Madame Clicquot Ponsardin (1777–1866), owner and developer of the champagne brand Veuve Clicquot
- Mercedes Erra (born 1954), business executive, co-founder of the BETC advertising agency, executive president of Havas Worldwide
- Véronique Laury, CEO of the Castorama DIY chain
- Anne Lauvergeon (born 1959), former CEO of the Areva energy group
- Géraldine Le Meur (born 1972), innovator, business executive, co-founder of LeWeb conferences
- Laurence Parisot (born 1959), former head of the MEDEF employers' union
- Marie-Hélène Peugeot-Roncoroni (born c.1961), member of the board of PSA Peugeot Citroën
- Dominique Reiniche (born 1955), chair of Coca-Cola Europe
- Ariane de Rothschild (born 1965), banker, vice president of Edmond de Rothschild Holding
- Marie-Laure Sauty de Chalon (born 1962), businesswoman, feminist, CEO of aufeminin
- Corinne Vigreux (born 1964), business executive, co-founder and managing director of the Dutch consumer electronics company TomTom

=== Germany ===
- Kerstin Günther (born 1967), business executive, senior positions in Deutsche Telekom Group
- Susanne Klatten (born 1962), influential board member and majority shareholder of the chemicals manufacturer Altana
- Aygül Özkan (born 1971), politician, former minister in Lower Saxony
- Johanna Quandt (1926–2015), served as deputy chair of BMW
- Anni Schaad (1911–1988), founded the jewellery company Langani
- Madeleine Schickedanz (born 1943), former billionaire shareholder in Quelle and Arcandor which declared bankruptcy in 2009
- Leonore Semler (1921–2016), founder in 1963 of the German branch of the African Medical and Research Foundation
- Sybill Storz (1937–2025), headed the Karl Storz GmbH, a medical device company
- Sylvia Ströher (born 1954), formerly headed the family's successful cosmetics business Wella, sold in 2004
- Angela Merkel (born 1954), Chancellor of Germany (2005–2021)

=== Greece ===
- Gianna Angelopoulos-Daskalaki (born 1955), politician, businesswoman, president of the bidding committee for the 2004 Summer Olympics
- Zoe Cruz (born 1955), Greek-American banking executive, former co-president of Morgan Stanley
- Angeliki Frangou, shipowner, chair and CEO of Navios Maritime Holdings
- Helen Vlachos (1911–1995), newspaper-publishing proprietor, anti-junta activist

=== Iceland ===
- Aslaug Magnusdottir, business executive in the fashion industry, CEO of Moda Operandi
- Svafa Grönfeldt, former vice president of Actavis, president of Reykjavik University

=== Ireland ===
- Elaine Coughlan, venture capitalist, co-founded of Atlantic Bridge Capital
- Eileen Gray (1878–1976), pioneer of modern architecture in Ireland
- Mary Guiney (1901–2004), former chair of the Clerys department store
- Anne Heraty (born 1961), CEO of CPL Resources
- Aedhmar Hynes (born 1966), business executive, member of several company boards
- Louise O'Sullivan (born 1973), telecommunications executive, founder and CEO of Anam Technologies

=== Israel ===
- Shari Arison (born 1957), businesswoman, owner of Arison Investments
- Anat Cohen-Dayag, president and CEO of the biotechnology firm Compugen
- Orit Gadiesh (born 1951), chair of the management consulting firm Bain & Company
- Ofra Strauss (born 1960), chair of the Strauss food producing group

=== Italy ===
- Barbara Labate (born c.1978), entrepreneur, co-founder and CEO of the comparative-pricing web company Risparmio Super

=== Netherlands ===
- Johanna Borski (1764–1846), influential banker
- Annette Nijs (born 1961), politician, former minister, China expert received China Government Friendship Award
- Melanie Schultz van Haegen (born 1970), politician, former minister
- Johanna Elisabeth Swaving (1754–1826), headed the early newspaper Oprechte Haerlemsche Courant
- Marina Tognetti, Amsterdam-based business executive, launched the Myngle online learning service

=== Norway ===
- Bettina Banoun (born 1972), lawyer, board member of the shipping company Wilh. Wilhelmsen
- Mimi Berdal (born 1959), lawyer, business executive, chair or board member of several companies including Itera, Synnøve Finden and Q-Free
- Lisbeth Berg-Hansen (born 1963), politician, business executive, chair of the Norwegian Institute of Marine Research, board member of several companies including Aker Seafoods
- Ingeborg Moen Borgerud (born 1949), lawyer, former politician and business executive with board positions in several companies
- Kjerstin Braathen (born 1970), Norwegian banker, CEO of DNB
- Gro Brækken (born 1952), has held executive positions in several companies, since 2010 director of the Norwegian Oil Industry Association
- Kari Gjesteby (born 1947), politician, businesswoman, has held several ministerial posts and has been a director of the Bank of Norway and the National Library of Norway
- Elisabeth Grieg (born 1959), business executive, part owner of the Grieg Group, also holds several board positions
- Annette Malm Justad (born 1958), businessperson, board member of several companies including Petroleum Geo-Services and Camillo Eitzen & Co
- Wenche Kjølås (born 1962), businessperson, executive positions, including in companies belonging to the Grieg Group
- Catharina Lysholm (1744–1815), ship-owner, managed Fru Agentinde Lysholm & Co
- Åse Aulie Michelet (born 1952), businessperson, pharmacist, CEO of Marine Harvest
- Gro Møllerstad (born 1960), businessperson, politician
- Wenche Nistad (born 1952), businessperson, civil servant, has been director of Den norske Bank
- Anette S. Olsen (born 1956), businessperson, owner and head of the Fred. Olsen shipping company
- Margareth Øvrum (born 1958), civil engineer, businessperson, executive vice president at Statoil
- Hanne Refsholt (born 1960), agronomist, businessperson, CEO of the dairy cooperative Tine
- Karin Refsnes (born 1947), civil servant, businessperson
- Marit Reutz (born 1952), businessperson, former chair of the National Library of Norway
- Berit Svendsen (born 1963), engineer, businessperson, vice president of the Telenor Group, head of Telenor Norway
- Karen Toller (1662–1742), early shipowner
- Aud Marit Wiig (born 1953), diplomat, businessperson, ambassador to Pakistan

=== Poland ===
- Barbara Hulanicki (born 1936), fashion designer, founder of the London store Biba
- Alicja Kornasiewicz (born 1951), politician, businessperson, former government minister
- Helena Rubinstein (1872–1965), Polish American business magnate

=== Portugal ===
- Antonia Ferreira (1811–1896), early businesswoman associated with port wine
- Gracia Mendes Nasi (1510–1569), Renaissance business figure with her business partner Joseph Nasi

=== Romania ===
- Maria Antonescu (1892–1964), philanthropist, wife of Prime Minister Ion Antonescu
- Mariana Gheorghe (born 1956), general manager of the oil company Petrom
- Monica Iacob Ridzi (born 1977), politician, member of the European Parliament
- Sorina-Luminița Plăcintă (born 1965), politician, former minister
- Carmen Radu, former president and CEO of Exim Bank
- Irina Schrotter (born 1965), fashion designer, businessperson
- Ileana Sonnabend (1914–2007), art dealer, ran the Sonnabend Gallery in New York City

=== Russia ===
- Yelena Baturina (born 1963), businessperson, former mayor of Moscow, founded the investment and construction company Inteco
- Natalya Kaspersky (born 1966), former chair of the antivirus company Kaspersky Lab
- Margarita Louis-Dreyfus (born 1962), Russian-born Swiss chair of the Louis Dreyfus conglomerate

=== Serbia ===
- Madlena Zepter, founder and owner of the Madlenianum Opera and Theatre

=== Spain ===
- Esther Koplowitz, Marquise of Cubas (born 1953), businessperson, vice president of Fomento de Construcciones y Contratas
- Ana Maiques (born 1973), entrepreneur, CEO of Neuroelectrics

=== Sweden ===
- Gunilla Asker (born 1962), CEO of the newspaper Svenska Dagbladet
- Maria Borelius (born 1960), former minister, business executive
- Anna Bråkenhielm (born 1966), business leader active in television and the media
- Mia Brunell (born 1965), CEO of the Axel Johnson investment company
- Stina Ehrensvärd (born 1967), Swedish-American entrepreneur, CEO of Yubico, co-inventor of the YubiKey
- Marie Ehrling (born 1955), business executive, chair of TeliaSonera
- Annika Falkengren (born 1962), president and CEO of Skandinaviska Enskilda Banken
- Karin Forseke (born 1955), former CEO of Carnegie Investment Bank
- Sofia Gumaelius (1840–1915), early businesswoman, founder of the Gumaelius advertising agency
- Hanna Hammarström (1829–1909), inventor, industrialist, manufactured telephone wires
- Helena Helmersson (born 1973), senior manager at the H&M retail clothing company
- Antonia Ax:son Johnson (born 1943), chair of Axel Johnson
- Bonnie Roupé (born 1976), founder of the Chinese health company Bonzun
- Cecilia Stegö Chilò (born 1959), politician, businessperson
- Azita Shariati (born 1968), heads the Swedish branch of the catering and services multinational Sodexo
- Wilhelmina Skogh (1849–1926), hotel manager and owner
- Cristina Stenbeck (born 1977), chair and main owner of Investment AB Kinnevik
- Charlotte Strömberg (born 1959), former CEO of the JLL real estate company
- Louise Wachtmeister (born 1978), entrepreneur, athlete, political activist
- Tina Persson, PhD, CEO of Passage2Pro

=== Switzerland ===
- Ruth Guler (1930–2015), hotel owner
- Nayla Hayek (born 1951), business executive, chair of the Swatch Group
- Dominique Lévy, art dealer, owner of the Dominique Lévy Gallery
- Margarita Louis-Dreyfus, businesswoman, chair of Louis Dreyfus Group
- Vera Michalski (born 1954), president of several publishing houses

=== Turkey ===
- Suzan Sabancı Dinçer (born 1965), chair of Akbank, board member of Sabancı Holding
- Matild Manukyan (1914–2001), real estate investor
- Güler Sabancı (born 1955), chair of Sabancı Holding
- Sevgi Sabancı (born 1963), businessperson with interests in several companies
- Serpil Timuray, CEO of Vodafone Turkey
- Arzuhan Yalçındağ (born 1965), chair of Doğan Holding

=== United Kingdom ===
See Category:British businesswomen

- Melanie Dawes (born 1966), Permanent Secretary of the Department for Communities and Local Government
- Liliane Landor (born c.1956), Lebanese born journalist and broadcasting executive

== North America ==
=== Bahamas ===
- Betsy Boze, business executive, past president of the College of The Bahamas

=== Canada ===
- Alison Redford (born 1965), 14th Premier of Alberta
- Catherine Callbeck (born 1939), 28th Premier of Prince Edward Island, first female provincial premier to win a general election\
- Christy Clark (born 1965), 35th Premier of British Columbia
- Eva Aariak (born 1955), 2nd Premier of Nunavut, represent the electoral district of Iqaluit East in the Legislative Assembly of Nunavut
- Kathleen Wynne (born 1953), 25th Premier of Ontario
- Kathy Dunderdale (born 1952), 10th Premier of Newfoundland and Labrador
- Kim Campbell (born 1947), 19th Prime Minister of Canada, chairperson for Canada's Supreme Court Advisory Board
- Lois Mitchell (born 1939/1940), businesswoman and philanthropist, the 18th Lieutenant Governor of Alberta
- Nellie Cournoyea (born 1940), 6th Premier of the Northwest Territories, first female Premier of a Canadian territory, Norwegian and Inupiaq heritage
- Pat Duncan (born 1960), 6th Premier of the Yukon, first female Premier of the Yukon
- Pauline Marois (born 1949), 30th Premier of Quebec
- Rachel Notley (born 1964), 17th Premier of Alberta
- Rita Johnston (born 1935), politician in British Columbia, first female Premier in Canada, 29th Premier of British Columbia
- Sonja Bata (1926–2018), Swiss-born businesswoman, founder and chair of the world's largest shoe museum

=== El Salvador ===
- María Eugenia Brizuela de Ávila (born 1956), lawyer, business executive, former foreign minister

=== Mexico ===
- María Asunción Aramburuzabala (born 1963), business executive, chair of Tresalia Capital
- Angélica Fuentes (born 1963), business executive, founder of the cosmetics brand Angelíssima, executive and shareholder of Omnilife-Angelissima-Chivas
- Bertha González Nieves (born 1970), businesswoman, co-founder and CEO of the Casa Dragones tequila company
- Eva Gonda de Rivera, owns a major stake in the FEMSA beverage company

=== Puerto Rico ===
- María Luisa Arcelay (1898–1981), educator, businesswoman, politician
- Camalia Valdés (born 1972), president and CEO of the brewery Compañía Cervecera de Puerto Rico

=== United States ===
See Category:American businesswomen, Category:American women in politics

- Jewel Freeman Graham (1925–2015), educator, social worker, second black woman to head the YWCA
- Zipporah Michelbacher Cohen (1853–1944), American civic leader, president Ladies Hebrew Benevolent Association in Richmond, Virginia
- Jennifer Martin (born 1973), American author, born in Canada; leader in business startups, American actress, producer, and author.

- Mischel Kwon, founder and CEO of MKACyber, a cybersecurity services firm specializing in Security Operations Centers (SOCs); former Director of US-CERT at the U.S. Department of Homeland Security.

== South America ==
=== Argentina ===
- Beatriz Rojkés de Alperovich (born 1956), Argentine senator

=== Brazil ===
- Samantha Aquim, founder of Q-Zero Chocolate
- Vera Cordeiro (born 1950), founder of Brazil Child Health
- Maria Helena Moraes Scripilliti, co-owner of the Votorantim Group
- Eliana Tranchesi, entrepreneur, owner of the Daslu fashion house
- Luiza Helena Trajano, entrepreneur, chairwoman of the Magazine Luiza retail company

=== Chile ===
- Ingrid Antonijevic (born 1952), entrepreneur, business executive, politician

=== Peru ===
- Keiko Fujimori (born 1975), politician, former First Lady
- Lourdes Mendoza (born 1958), businessperson, politician

=== Uruguay ===
- Laetitia d'Arenberg (born 1941), business executive, owner of several companies

=== Venezuela ===
- Laetitia d'Arenberg, business executive, luxury fashion entrepreneur
- Hilda Ochoa-Brillembourg (born 1945), founder and CEO of Strategic Investment Group
