= Wenche Kjølås =

Norwegian businessperson (born 1962)

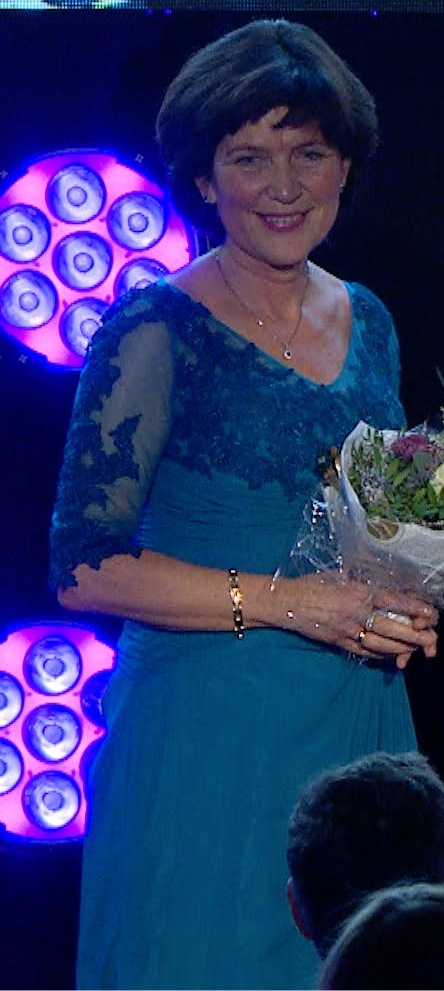

Wenche Kjølås (born 20 December 1962) is a Norwegian businessperson.

She hails from Stranda Municipality, and is educated as a master in economics and business administration from the Norwegian School of Economics. From 1986 to 1992 she worked in Touche Ross. She then became financial manager in Hakon Gruppen from 1993 to 1995 and financial director in Kavli Holding from 1995. She was also managing director in Kavli from 1997 to 1999

From 2006 she was the chief financial officer of Grieg Logistics, and in 2009 she became managing director of Grieg Maturitas. This is the parent company in Grieg Gruppen, and Kjølås is also a board member of the daughter companies Grieg Group Resources (chair), Grieg Seafood, Grieg Property, Grieg Logistics and Grieg Gaarden.

In 1996–1997 Kjølås was a member of the governmental Norges Eksportråd. In 2006 she was noted as being among the most sought-after female board members in Norwegian enterprise, with six memberships on boards of directors. Kjølås chairs the board of Flytoget since 2013, and has been a member of the board of Cermaq (2003–2009), Selvaag Bolig (2011–2013), DOF ASA, Petroleum Geo-Services, Kavli and Q–meieriene.
