= Diva Dubai Modeling Agency =

Modelling agency

Diva Dubai Modelling agency
- Industry: Modeling agency, Event Production, Talent Management
- Founded: 2003
- Founder: Nicole Rodrigues
- Headquarters: Dubai, United Arab Emirates
- Area served: World Wide
- Key people: Nicole Rodrigues (CEO)
- Website: www.divadubai.com

Diva Dubai Modeling agency is a multinational talent management and event production company based in Dubai. The company was founded in 2003 by Nicole Rodrigues.

== Location ==
In 2023, Diva Dubai Modeling Agency opened offices at Al Khayat Avenue, Dubai UAE.

== History and Partnership ==
Diva Dubai Modeling Agency was founded in 2003 by Nicole Rodrigues. The company manages artists, musicians, athletes, and other public-facing figures. In 2024, they signed a partnership deal with Creative Artists Agency.

== See also ==
- List of modeling agencies

== External references ==
- How Diva Dubai Is Revolutionizing Model Training and Development
- Dubai-based modeling agency Diva launches innovative new website
- Dubai’s Fashion Scene Unveiled: Diva Dubai Models Star in Exciting New Amazon Prime Series
- Diva Dubai Model Partners with Creative Artists Agency
