= SS Gro =

SS Gro is the name of the following ships:

- SS Gro (1895), sunk by SM UC-47 on 22 August 1917
- SS Gro (1917), sunk by U-47 on 7 September 1940

== See also ==
- Gro (disambiguation)
