= Sigismund of Habsburg-Lorraine =

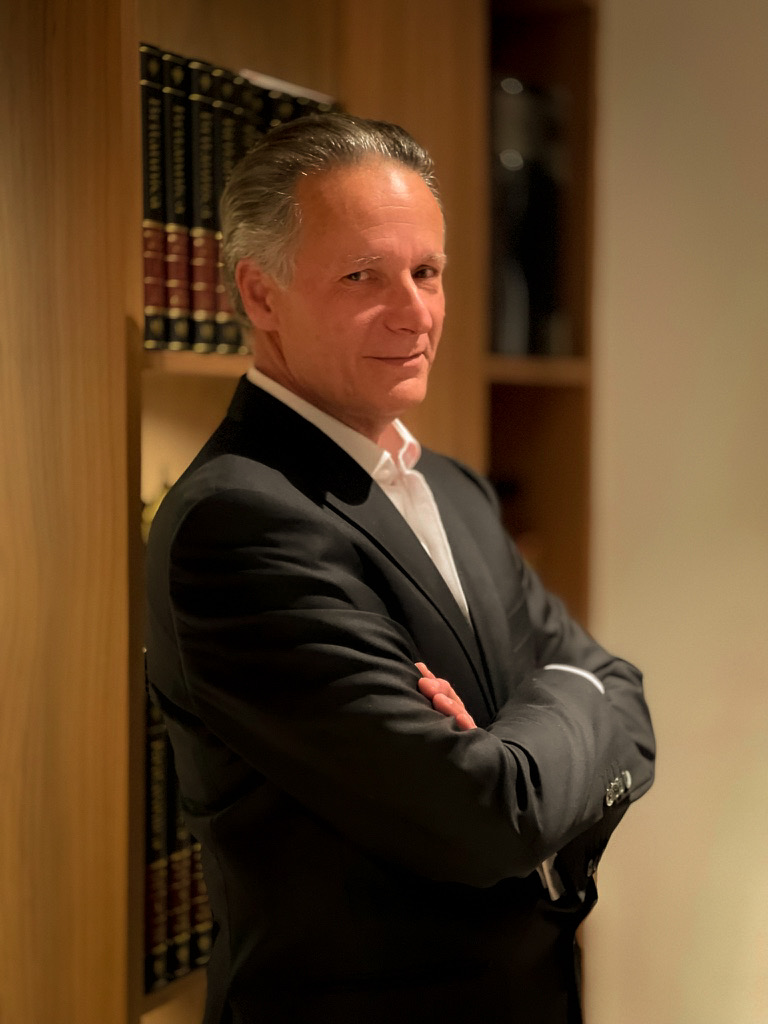
- Sigismund in 2021

Head of the House of Habsburg-Tuscany
- Pretense: 18 June 1993 – present
- Predecessor: Archduke Leopold Franz
- Born: 21 April 1966 (age 60); Lausanne
- Spouse: Elyssa Juliet Edmonstone (m. 1999–2013)
- Issue: 3
Names
- Sigismund Otto Maria Josef Gottfried Henrich Erik Leopold Ferdinand von Habsburg-Lothringen and Otón María José Godofredo Enrique Erick Leopoldo Fernando de Habsburgo-Lorena
- House: Habsburg-Lorraine
- Father: Archduke Leopold Franz, Prince of Tuscany
- Mother: Laetitia d'Arenberg

Sigismund Otto von Habsburg-Lothringen (born 21 April 1966) is the head of the Tuscan branch of the House of Habsburg-Lorraine, and claimant to the defunct throne of the Grand Duchy of Tuscany since 1993. He uses the courtesy titles of Archduke of Austria and Grand Duke of Tuscany. Born in Switzerland and raised in Uruguay, he has served as Ambassador of the Sovereign Military Order of Malta to Uruguay since 2025.

== Biography ==
Segismundo Otto was born on 21 April 1966 in Lausanne, Switzerland. His father was Archduke Leopoldo Franz, son of Archduke Gottfried of Austria and a claimant to the defunct throne of the Grand Duchy of Tuscany, and a great-grandson of Ferdinand IV, Grand Duke of Tuscany, the last ruler of that state. His mother, Laetitia d'Arenberg, is a French-Uruguayan businesswoman and socialite descended from French noble families.

He was raised between Switzerland and Uruguay. He was educated at the University of Westminster, where he obtained a bachelor of science degree. He subsequently completed a Master of Business Administration at Imperial College London.

In 1993, his father, Archduke Leopold Franz of Austria-Tuscany, renounced his rights as head of the Tuscan grand ducal family in favour of Sigismund, as his second marriage—contracted after a divorce—conflicted with the statutes of the Order of Saint Stephen, of which he was then head. Since then, Sigismund has been the head of the Tuscan branch of the House of Habsburg-Lorraine.

On 11 September 1999 in London, Sigismund married Elyssa Edmonstone, daughter of Sir Archibald Bruce Edmonstone, 7th Baronet of Edmonstone of Duntreath and his second wife, Julieta Isabel Deakin, daughter of Major-General Peter Deakin. The couple divorced on 25 June 2013.

In 2024 he bought an apartment in Montevideo.
