= Gro (given name) =

- Gender: Female
- Language: Norwegian

Origin
- Region of origin: Norway

Gro (Norwegian pronunciation: [ˈɡruː]) is a feminine Norwegian given name. Notable people with the name include:

- Gró, a figure in Norse mythology
- Gro Brækken (born 1952), Norwegian businessperson
- Gro Harlem Brundtland (born 1939), Norwegian politician
- Gro Pedersen Claussen (born 1941), Norwegian graphic designer
- Gro Dahle (born 1962), Norwegian writer
- Gro Espeseth (born 1972), Norwegian footballer
- Gro Gulden (born 1939), Norwegian mycologist
- Gro Hagemann (born 1945), Norwegian historian
- Gro Holm (born 1958), Norwegian news editor and correspondent
- Gro Marit Istad Kristiansen (born 1978), Norwegian biathlete
- Gro Kvinlog (born 1976), Norwegian skier
- Gro Møllerstad (born 1960), Norwegian businessperson
- Gro Sandvik (born 1942), Norwegian flautist
- Gro Anita Schønn (1950–2001), Norwegian singer
- Gro Skartveit (born 1965), Norwegian politician
- Gro Steinsland (born 1945), Norwegian historian
- Gro Hillestad Thune (born 1943), Norwegian jurist
