= Mariéme Jamme =

Senegalese-born French-British businesswoman and technology activist

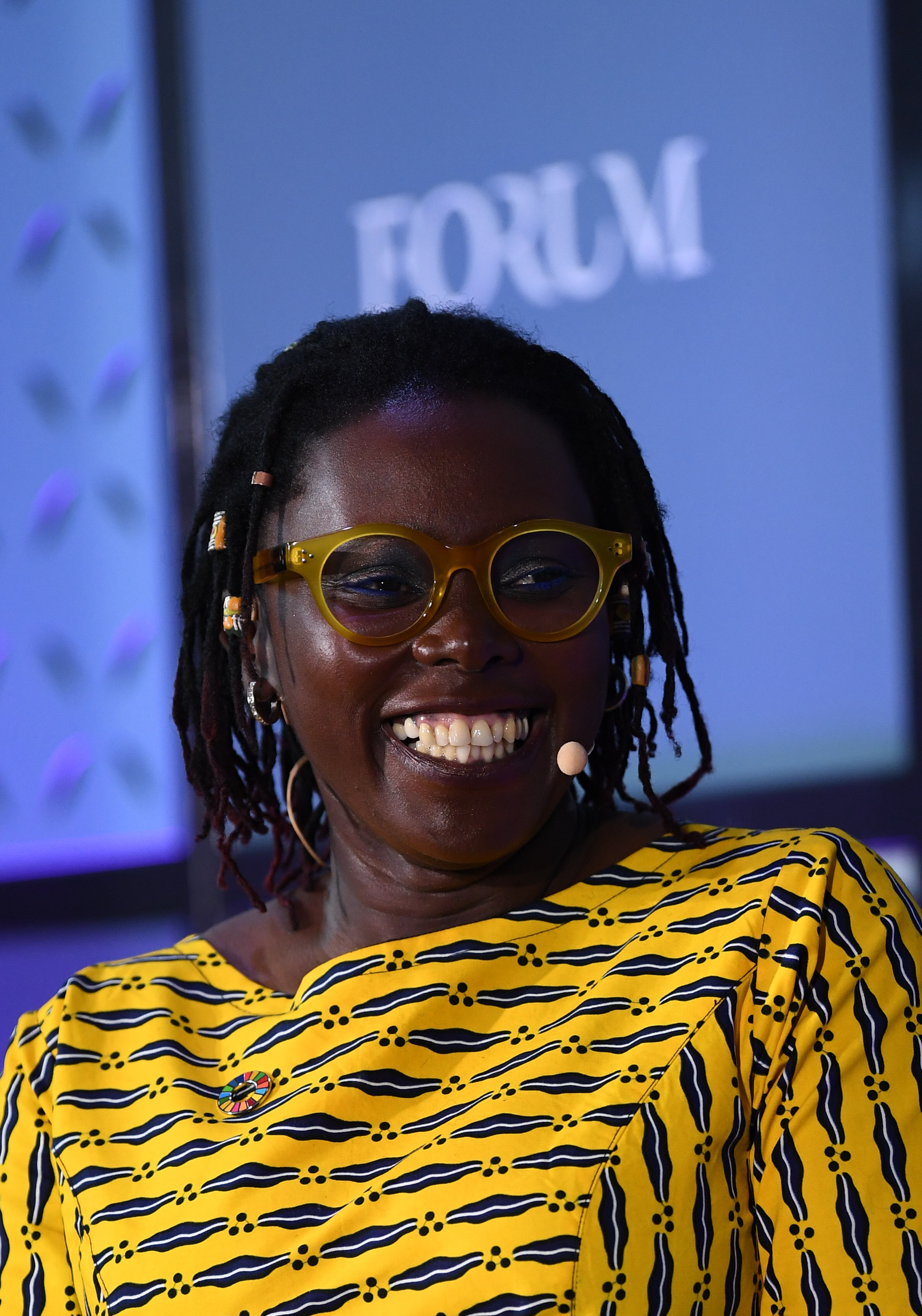
- Born: 1974 (age 51–52); Dakar, Senegal, West Africa
- Occupations: Tech entrepreneur, founder of iamtheCODE
- Website: mariemejamme.com

Marieme Jamme (born 1974) is a Senegalese-born French-British businesswoman and technology activist. In 2016 she founded the iamtheCODE Foundation and served on the World Wide Web Foundation board. In 2017, Quartz Africa included Jamme in their "Quartz Africa Innovators 2017" list. In 2013 she was nominated as a Young Global Leader at the World Economic Forum. In 2017, she won the Innovation Award at the Global Goals Award as a Goalkeepers for her work in advancing the United Nations Sustainable Development Goals, curated by UNICEF and the Bill & Melinda Gates Foundation, for globally supporting girls and young women and advancing the UN's Sustainable Development Goals. That same year, she was listed as one of BBC's 100 Women.

== Early life and education ==
Mariéme Jamme was born in Dakar, Senegal. She taught herself to read and write in her teenage years.

There have been conflicting accounts from Jamme with regards to her early life. In early interviews, including with CNN in 2012, she stated that she had a turbulent childhood and was born in Senegal to privileged parents with her mother being an aristocrat, and after the death of her father in 1992 moved to France, where she worked in restaurants and cleaning jobs to fund her studies in marketing and communication. In a 2014 interview with Radio France Internationale, Jamme discussed coming from a wealthy family living comfortably in Dakar before moving to France, where she worked a number of odd jobs to independently finance her Master's in Marketing and Communication. According to the same interview, she then moved to the UK to improve her English, and obtained an MBA at the University of Surrey, before being hired by Citibank and then by JP Morgan and Lloyds Bank, before spending time in management at software manufacturers Oracle and Microsoft.

In other publications, Jamme has stated that she experienced considerable hardship during her childhood; she was abandoned by her mother, did not receive a formal education, and at age 11 was raped by her Quranic teacher in Senegal. She has also said that at age 13, she was trafficked to France, where she spent time homeless and in prostitution, with some interviews saying that at age 16 she was taken by the police to a refugee camp, and at 18 moved to the United Kingdom. Other reports say she moved to the UK at 16, and there she began to educate herself and taught herself computer programming. During a 2019 interview with O Globo in Brazil, Jamme said that she was abandoned by her mother at age 6 and moved to Guildford, Surrey, UK at age 16, where she taught herself to read and write in a local library and worked as a cleaner.

In a 2019 interview, Italian newspaper La Repubblica raised these discrepancies; however, Jamme terminated the interview and did not comment. La Repubblica commented that she had a personal history that is "as romantic as it is dubious".

== Career ==
She built her technology career when she moved to the United Kingdom, where she attended the University of Surrey to learn English. While cleaning people's houses for a living, She also learned coding at a local library in Surrey. She has had multiple temporary jobs and worked for companies such as Citibank, HSBC, JP Morgan, and Lloyds Bank. She has also served in Business management positions at Oracle and Microsoft. In 2013, she was appointed to Microsoft’s 4Afrika team, where she served in an advisory role to projects that aided African startup companies.

Jamme founded SpotOne Global Solutions (now called Accur8Global) in 2007 in the UK and is the CEO. The company helps IT organizations establish in Europe, the Middle East, Africa and Asia. She is the co-founder of Africa Gathering, the first global platform for entrepreneurs and experts to network with regards to development across Africa. Jamme was referred to as being "at the forefront of the technology revolution that is slowly transforming Africa" by CNN. She has been involved in various African competitions for tech innovation including the annual "Apps4Africa" competition as an organiser and judge, showcasing innovation and app ideas across the continent of Africa, and the Royal Academy of Engineering Africa prize for Innovation.

In 2013, Jamme was honoured as a Young Global Leader by the World Economic Forum for her activism work in empowering and investing in young girls and women in Africa, the Middle East, and Asia through creative learning, entrepreneurship, science, technology, engineering, art, mathematics, and design (STEAMD). In 2015, Jamme collaborated with a group of African leaders to create "Accur8Africa", an initiative to help governments, civil society, entrepreneurs, and businesses evaluate progress on the UN's Sustainable Development Goals by 2030 using Accurate Data.

=== iamtheCODE Foundation ===
2017 saw the launch of Jamme's "iamtheCODE" initiative, which became the first African-led initiative that collaborated with government, private sector, and investors to advance STEAMD education for girls from under-privileged areas in Africa, South America and the Middle East. The program's goal is to contribute in achieving the UN sustainability goals for education by reaching 1 million girls by 2030. The foundation aims to inspire more girls worldwide to learn to code, with an emphasis on including marginalised communities by providing them with educational spaces, tools and employment guidance.

=== World Wide Web Foundation board and awards ===
In 2017 Jamme became the first black woman on the World Wide Web Foundation Board. That same year, she was recognised as one of five inspiring leaders at the Goalkeepers Global Goals Awards, which were hosted by U.N. Deputy Secretary-General Amina J. Mohammed and Melinda Gates, where she won the Innovation Award.

== Other activities ==
- Microsoft, Member of the 4Afrika Advisory Council (since 2013)

== Recognition ==
Jamme was included in the 2019 and 2020 editions of the Powerlist, a listing of the 100 most influential people in the UK of African/African-Caribbean descent.
