= GRO =

GRO or Gro may refer to:

== Organisations ==
- General Register Office
- General Register Office (Northern Ireland)

== Technology and science ==
- Generic receive offload, in computer networking
- GRO structure file format, used by GROMACS

== Transportation ==
- Girona–Costa Brava Airport (IATA code), Spain
- J. Douglas Galyon Depot (Station code), North Carolina, US
- Rota International Airport (FAA LID code), Northern Mariana Islands

== Other uses ==
- Green River Ordinance (band), an American rock band
- Gro (given name)
- Gró, a figure in Norse mythology
- Groma language (ISO 639-3 code) - language spoken by some Tibetans

== See also ==
- Compton Gamma Ray Observatory (CGRO)
