= Laetitia d'Arenberg =

French Uruguayan businesswoman (born 1941)

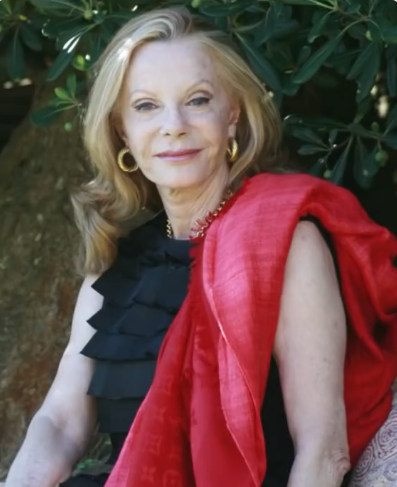
- Born: Lætitia Marie Madeleine Susanne Valentine de Belzunce; 2 September 1941 (age 85); Brummana, Mandate of Lebanon
- Spouses: Archduke Leopold Franz of Austria (m. 1965; div. 1981) John Anson
- Issue: Archduke Sigismund; Archduke Guntram
- House: Belzunce (by birth); Arenberg (by adoption); Habsburg-Lorraine (by marriage)
- Father: Henri, Marquis de Belzunce
- Mother: Marie-Thérèse de la Poëze d'Harambure

Laetitia Marie Madeleine Susanne Valentine de Belzunce d'Arenberg (born 2 September 1941), mostly known as Laetitia d'Arenberg, is a French-Uruguayan businesswoman, socialite and philanthropist. Head of the Grupo d'Arenberg, she runs Lapataia, a Uruguayan brand of dairy products, chocolate, and dulce de leche.

== Early life ==
Lætitia de Belsunce was born on 2 September 1941 in Brummana, in the Mandate for Syria and the Lebanon (present-day Lebanon), to French noble parents. Her father was Henri, Marquis de Belzunce (1909–1944), a member of an ancient noble family originally from Lower Navarre, which held the seigneurie of Belzunce near Bayonne and had received the Honneurs de la Cour at Paris in 1739. Her mother, Marie-Thérèse de La Poëze d’Harambure (1911–2005), was the daughter of Jean de La Poëze, Marquis d’Harambure.

At the time of her birth, during World War II, her father was serving with the Moroccan Tirailleurs, while her mother was working with the International Red Cross. While being transported to Syria, the ambulance in which her mother was travelling passed through a mined area, which resulted in a premature birth. After receiving medical care in Beirut, Lætitia was sent to live with her grandparents at their residence in La Roche-Posay, where she remained until the end of the war. Her father later died during the Battle of Monte Cassino in May 1944.

In 1949, her widowed mother remarried a former friend, Prince Erik Engelbert, 11th Duke of Arenberg (1901–1992), who adopted his stepchildren, Lætitia and her brother Rodrigo (1944–2008). As a result, they assumed his surname and the titles of princess and prince. In 1950, the family emigrated to Uruguay due to fears that the Korean War might expand into Europe, arriving at the Port of Montevideo aboard the transatlantic liner SS Conte Grande in late November.

In Uruguay, the family settled in Punta del Este, where they established a residence they named Villa d’Arenberg, and where Lætitia attended public schools. Following the end of the Korean War and the easing of fears of a wider international conflict, the family returned to Europe. They first settled in Switzerland and later in England, where Lætitia attended boarding schools during her teenage years. Despite their return to Europe, the family continued to travel to Uruguay each summer, where Lætitia worked as a helper at a public hospital in Maldonado.

== Business career ==
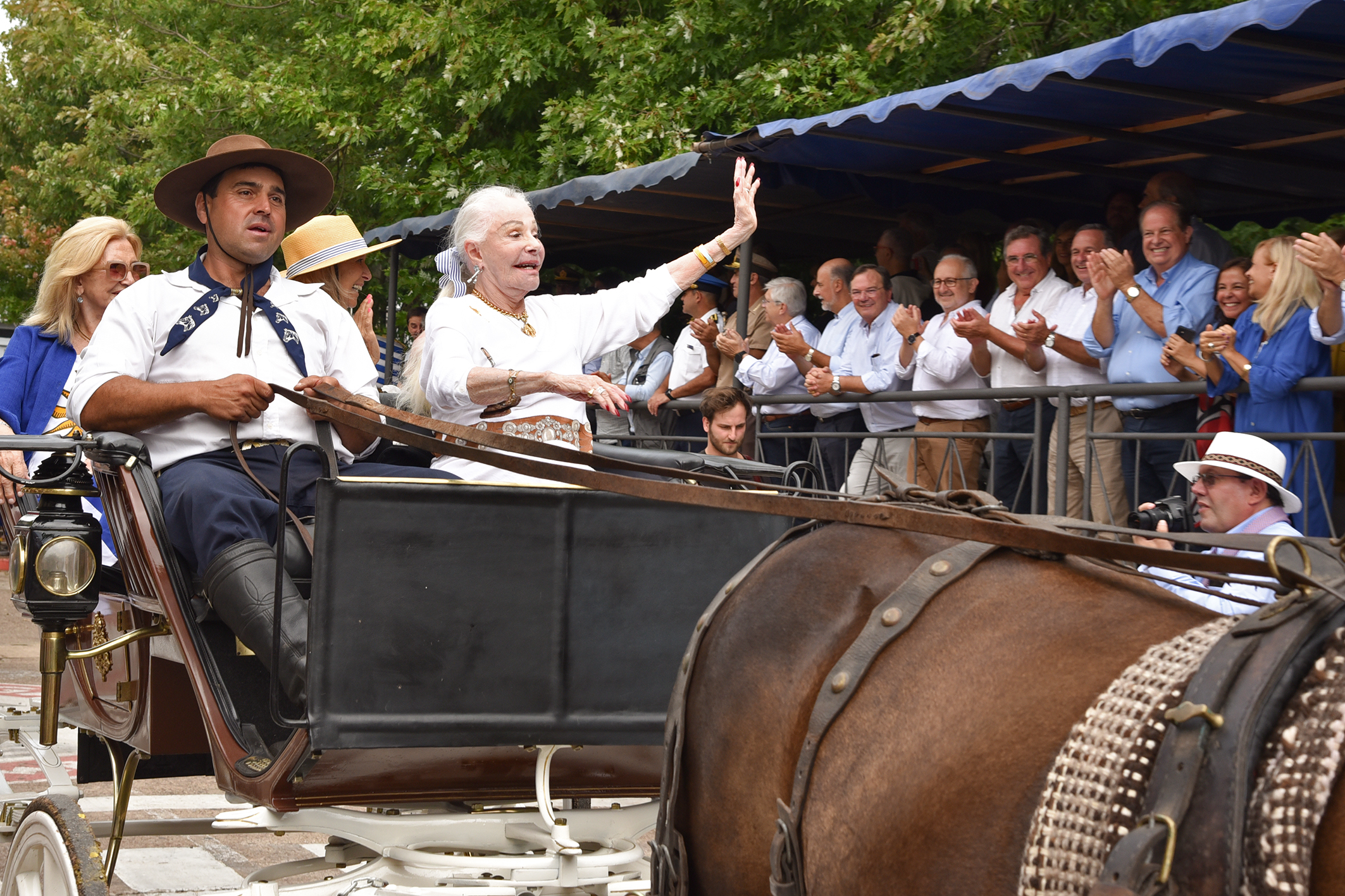
Laetitia d’Arenberg during the opening parade of the Fiesta de la Patria Gaucha, 2024.

In the early 1970s, after several years living in Europe and being part of the European jet set, Lætitia settled permanently in Uruguay, where she became a prominent figure in the social scene of Montevideo and Punta del Este, alongside her brother. She also acquired a 1,800-hectare property known as Los Fresnos, where she began raising cattle.

In 1973, she subsequently acquired a rural property in Florida Department, where she established Estancia Las Rosas, an agricultural estate and cattle ranch. The estate breeds Hereford and Aberdeen Angus, as well as Jersey and Holstein cattle, and raises sheep, producing wool, beef, milk and livestock genetics. She also ventured into the breeding of Arabian horses, with which she has won various international awards. She has long been associated with Uruguay’s cattle-ranching sector and rural life.

She heads the d’Arenberg Group, which owns companies operating in numerous sectors. In 2007 she acquired Tambo Lapataia, a company dedicated to the production of dairy products, Uruguayan alfajores and dulce de leche, and established a tourist farm in Punta del Este. From 1991 to 2012, the group held the controlling stake in the company responsible for the representation and distribution of the brands Mitsubishi, JAC Motors and Mondial in Uruguay.

In 2021, together with her son Guntram, she launched the Lætitia d’Arenberg Foundation, aimed at promoting access to education and culture for children and young people, as well as supporting initiatives related to animal welfare and environmental protection.

== Marriage and children ==
On 19 June 1965 she was married civilly to HIRH Archduke Leopold Franz of Austria-Tuscany at St. Gilgen, Austria. The religious nuptials followed on 28 July at Menetou-Salon, France.

They have two children:

- Archduke Sigismund Otto of Austria, Prince of Tuscany (born 21 April 1966 in Lausanne), married on 11 September 1999 in Kensington, Elyssa Juliet Edmonstone (born 11 September 1973 in Glasgow), daughter of Sir Archibald Bruce Charles Edmonstone, 7th Baronet, and Juliet Elizabeth Deakin (daughter of Major-General Peter Deakin). They have three children. They divorced on 25 June 2013, with annulment in 2016. He is now head of the Tuscan Grand Ducal branch of the House of Habsburg-Lorraine.
- Archduke Guntram Maria of Austria, Prince of Tuscany (born 21 July 1967 in Punta del Este), married on 13 April 1996 in Cuernavaca, Debora de Sola (born 21 January 1970 in San Salvador), daughter of Orlando de Sola and Marion Liebes. They have two children.

Laetitia and her husband divorced on 21 May 1981 in Salzburg, Austria. Archduke Leopold Franz moved to Europe and remarried a commoner in June 1993 (and was again divorced in 1998). He renounced his headship of the House of Tuscany in favor of his and Laetitia's elder son on 12 April 1994, while Laetitia remained in Uruguay. Some years later she was remarried, to John Anson, until his death in December 2025.

== See also ==
- House of Arenberg
- Famille de Belzunce
