= Grocery Manufacturers of Norway =

The Grocery Manufacturers of Norway (Norwegian: Dagligvareleverandørenes Forening, DLF) is an interest organization for companies that produce goods delivered to Norwegian grocery stores.

In mid-2009 the association had 96 member companies. It is itself a member body of European Brands Association.

The current CEO is Helge Hasselgård, and the board of directors consists of Rune Nordli, Jørgen Wiig, Hanne Refsholt, Lars Midtgaard, Hans Chr. Bøe, Leif Atle Viken and Ingunn Haugen Hegdal.
