= Jon Gosier =

American software developer

- Born: Jonathan D. Gosier; 1981 or 1982 (age 44–45)
- Occupations: Entrepreneur, Philanthropist, Film financier
- Known for: Founder or co-founder of companies: Ushahidi, Appfrica, Apps4Africa, Audigent, FilmHedge
- Website: gosier.org

Jonathan D. Gosier (born 1981 or 1982) is a entrepreneur, investor, film financier, and philanthropist. He was named as one of Ten African Tech Voices to Follow on Twitter by CNN and one of the 25 most influential African-Americans in Technology by Business Insider. He was awarded a TED Fellowship in 2009 and later named a TED Senior Fellow. Gosier is Knight News Challenge award winner for Abayima which makes crisis communications technology for disasters. In 2013, Gosier was nominated as one of three Innovators of the Year by Black Enterprise Magazine for his work with data startup MetaLayer.

== Ushahidi ==
From 2009 to 2011 Jon Gosier was the Director of SwiftRiver at Ushahidi.

== Appfrica ==
Gosier is currently the founder and CEO of Appfrica. It is a technology firm based in Kampala, Uganda. in 2008 in Kampala, Uganda. The firm has been responsible for a number of technology initiatives responsible for promoting Africa's technology sector including Apps4Africa, HiveColab, QuestionBox and for helping Google Africa translate its page for Ugandan audiences.

== Apps4Africa ==
Gosier was one of the founders of Apps4Africa, an accelerator for African technology initiatives. Apps4Africa began with a series of Challenges whose sponsors include Appfrica and the U.S. Department of State. The goal of Apps4Africa is to promote 'African solutions to African problems' by rewarding African technologists seeking to impact society with their inventions. The competition asks civil society and citizens throughout the continent to submit local community challenges on issues like transparency and better governance, health, education and more. The project began in late 2009 with a partnership formed between Appfrica and the U.S. Department of State, Bureau of African Affairs, Office of Public Diplomacy (AF/PDPA) as part of President Barack Obama's administration's 21st Century Statecraft initiative.

== MetaLayer ==
Gosier co-founded MetaLayer in 2011 alongside business partner Matthew Griffiths. The company aimed to empower non-technical users to conduct data-driven research—such as identifying trends in large data sets, performing predictive analytics, and creating visualizations—through intuitive, drag-and-drop data science tools.

The company was acquired by D8A Group in August 2013.

== Audigent ==
Gosier co-founded Audigent in 2014, which is a data activation, curation, and identity platform that specializes in leveraging privacy-safe, first-party data to enhance media addressability and monetization without relying on cookies. In November 2024, Audigent was acquired by Experian. The deal was reported to be valued between $200 million and $250 million.

== Southbox Entertainment ==
Jon Gosier founded Southbox Entertainment in 2017. In September 2019, Southbox Entertainment announced its launch in Atlanta, to serve as a source of capital for filmmakers and TV producers.

== Abayima ==
Abayima is a non-profit organization that was founded to support citizens when their voices are threatened in the form of attacks on communications infrastructure.

Abayima (the Luganda word for "Guardian") was inspired by the plight of activists in countries like Uganda, Libya, Syria, and Egypt where authorities have been known to sever (or monitor) citizen access to the internet and mobile communication. During these 'internet black-outs', Abayima provides solutions that allow citizens and journalists to communicate in spite of such measures. In 2011 the project was piloted by Gosier and his colleagues when government authorities in Uganda began intercepting SMS messages, a popular means for communicating in developing countries during times of crisis.

== FilmHedge ==
Gosier is the CEO and Founder of FilmHedge, which was launched in 2020. The company provides financing for the film and television industry. Since its inception, FilmHedge has facilitated over $200 million in funding for more than 40 feature films and scripted series.

== Awards/Accolades ==
- 2012- CNN named him as Ten African Tech Voices to Follow on Twitter
- 2013 - Business Insider named him as one of the 25 most influential African-Americans in Technology
- 2013 - His mobile app, Abayima, was awarded a $150,000 grant from the Knight News Challenge
- 2013 - nominated as one of three Innovators of the Year by Black Enterprise Magazine for his work with data startup MetaLayer
- 2015 - TIME’s ‘12 New Faces of Black Leadership’
