= Q (dairy) =

Norwegian dairy company

Q–meieriene
- Product type: Milk
- Current owner: Kavli Foundation
- Country: Norway
- Markets: Norway
- Website: http://www.q-meieriene.no/

Q or Q–meieriene is a private dairy products company based in Bergen, Norway. It is owned by the Kavli Group (Kavli Holding AS) which in turn is owned by the Kavli Trust (Kavlifondet). It was founded in 2000 and operates two dairies; Jæren Gårdsmeieri located in Jæren and Gausdalmeieriet located in Gausdal. The two dairies process milk from about 500 farms, totaling 170,000 litres of milk daily (2006). Processed products include milk, yogurt, sour cream, cream and juice.
