= Queue-it =

Danish tech company

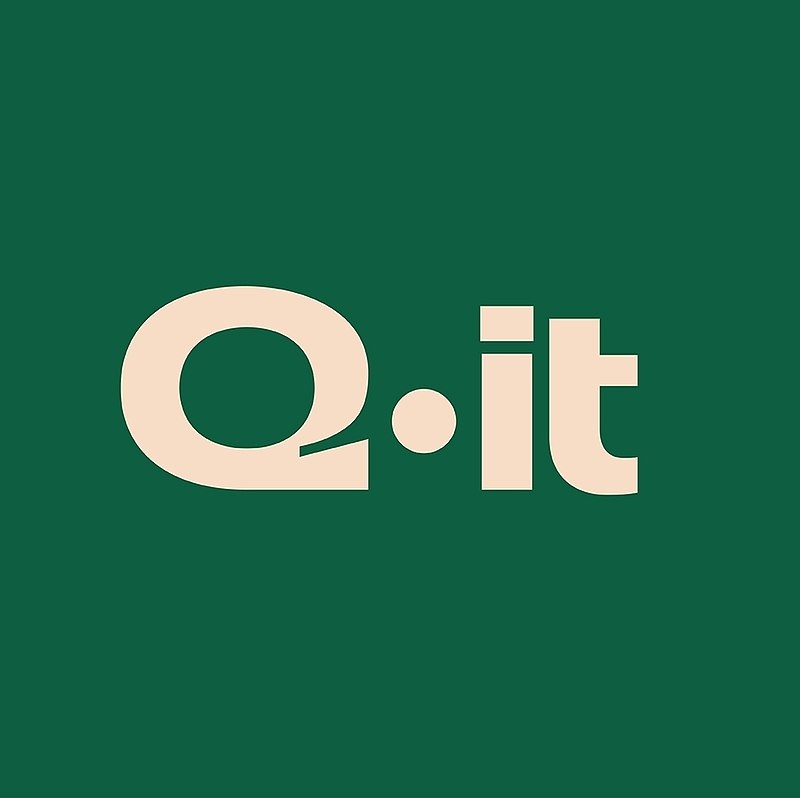
- Founded: 2010 (16 years ago)
- Headquarters: Copenhagen, Denmark
- Area served: Worldwide
- Founders: Niels Henrik Sodemann, Camilla Ley Valentin, Martin Pronk
- Industry: Computer Software
- Services: Software as a service
- Employees: 193 (October 2023)
- Website: queue-it.com

Queue-it is a private Danish company founded in 2010. It has developed systems to cope with website traffic congestion by directing visitors to a queue where they can wait until access can be facilitated. The company has achieved success by managing ticket sales bottlenecks for large, popular events. Clients include Ticketmaster, IKEA and Tokyo Metropolitan Government, among over 1000+ customers in ticketing, eCommerce, education, financial services and government services.

Founded by Niels Henrik Sodemann, Camilla Ley Valentin, and Martin Pronk, the system was initially developed in 2001 for coping with the capacity problems with Gentofte Municipality Ementor Webbooking (a web booking platform for municipalities marketed from 2001 to 2007 by Ementor). It was then expanded over the Internet using cloud computing from 2010. In 2011, the company succeeded in doubling revenue every quarter. By 2012, Queue-it was being used by the Danish tax authority Skat. Five years later, it was being used in over 30 countries, serving over 1.5 billion customers at peak periods. By July 2018, three billion users had gone through the company's queuing system and it was expected that four billion would have used it by Black Friday the following December.

In 2017, it was announced that an American branch, Queue-it Inc. was to be established in Minneapolis to serve American clients. The Danish Queue-it would nevertheless continue its operations and technical development in Copenhagen. In 2019, Queue-it announced the opening of an office in Sydney, Australia to provide its global customer base with business support across additional time zones in the Asia-Pacific Market. Statistics released by Queue-it Inc. in November 2017 indicated that 80% of retail customers were ready to wait in line to access e-commerce sites.

In 2020, Queue-it were sued by WeQ4U and Queue-Fair, which are both owned by the Orderly Mind group, for patent infringement. Queue-Fair reported, and posted evidence, that within three days of issuing a press release about the lawsuit, Queue-it removed their customer list from their web site and changed their demonstration site to remove evidence of patent-infringing processes. The case was concluded and settled on February 19, 2025.
