= Olav Kavli =

Norwegian businessman (1872–1958)

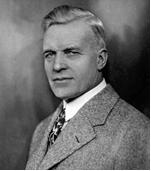
Olav Kavli

Olav Kavli (7 January 1872 – 22 September 1958) was a Norwegian business man who founded the Kavli company.

== Biography ==
Ole Knudsen Kavli was born at Årø in Bolsøy Municipality (now Molde Municipality) in Møre og Romsdal, Norway. He was the son of Knut Andreas Olsen and his wife Anne Jensdatter Stavem. Kavli grew up on Ytre Årø, a small farm east of Molde. As an 18-year-old he went to Bergen, where he took trade school courses.

As a 21-year-old in 1893, he established a delicatessen in Bergen. He soon established connections with trade with the United Kingdom, Sweden and Denmark with trade to the United States in 1910. He founded Kavli Holding A/S in Sandnes in 1914. Just before the World War I, Kavli began to produce more of the goods including both canned and cheeses.

The major breakthrough came in 1924 when he succeeded at creating the world's first durable soft cheese (smelteost) with a long shelf life. He named it after the first flowers of spring, Primula. By the 1930s, Primula cheese was exported to over 30 countries, with the United States the main market. Kavli spent much of his career travelling worldwide in promotion of his products.

Kavli was married in 1895 to Anna Magdalene Michelsen (1862-1941). He was the father of Knut Olavsen Kavli and Signe Olavsdatter Kavli.

His autobiography Med ost i kofferten was published in 1946. He died in Bergen in 1958 and was succeeded as corporate executive by his son, Knut Kavli (1895–1965).

== See also ==
- Kavli Trust
