= Primula (food) =

Food products manufactured and marketed by The Kavli Group

Primula Dips

Primula is the brand name associated with a range of food products manufactured and marketed by The Kavli Group. The best known range is Primula Cheese Spread. Primula cheese in tubes is supplied in varieties flavoured with several ingredients. Dips are also manufactured in several flavours. The products are sold in more than 20 countries.

== History ==
Primula Cheese Spread was developed in 1924 by Norwegian businessman Olav Kavli (1872–1958). Primula Cheese was the world's first spreadable cheese with a long shelf life and was named after the Primula flower. It was first introduced into the United Kingdom in 1929. By the 1930s, Primula cheese was exported to over 30 countries, with the United States the main market.

Primula cheese products are now manufactured at plants located in Norway, Sweden, Denmark and Great Britain. The Primula brand is owned by the Norwegian-based Kavli Group, which in turn is owned by the Kavli Trust (Kavlifondet). The Kavli Trust is a charitable organisation that donates a proportion of profits to causes such as research, cultural activities and humanitarian work.
