= HiveColab =

Innovation hub and startup incubator

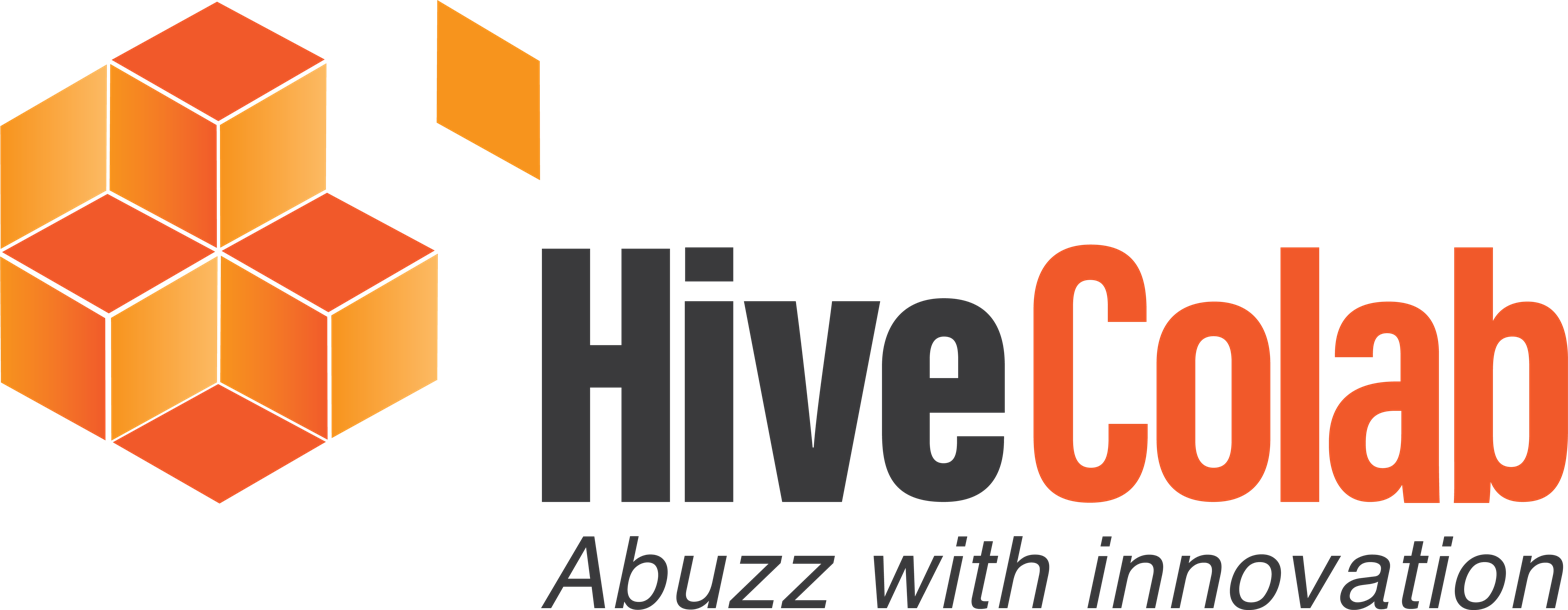
- Founded: June 2010
- Founders: Jon Gosier, Marieme Jamme, Daniel Stern, Teddy Ruge, Barbara Birungi
- Type: Technology innovation hub, business incubator, co-working space
- Legal status: Active
- Headquarters: 4th Floor, Kanjokya House, Plot 90, Kanjokya Street Kampala, Uganda
- Location: Kampala, Uganda
- Region served: East Africa
- Executive Director: Barbara Birungi
- Affiliations: AfriLabs
- Website: hivecolab.org

HiveColab (also written as Hive Colab) is an innovation hub, business incubator, and co-working space located in Kampala, Uganda. The hub was founded in June 2010, and is recognized alongside iHub as one of Africa's earliest technology hubs.

== History ==
HiveColab was established in June 2010 in the Kamwookya district of Kampala to address infrastructure and technical challenges facing students, local software developers, providing electrical power backup, high-speed internet, and workspace.

The hub was founded by technologist and Appfrica CEO Jon Gosier, Senegalese-born British businesswoman Marieme Jamme, Daniel Stern, Teddy Ruge, and Executive Director Barbara Birungi. Initial funding and operational support were provided by Appfrica, IndigoTrust, and the Dutch organization Hivos.

HiveColab is a founding member of AfriLabs, a network connecting technology innovation hubs across the African continent. Co-founder Barbara Birungi has highlighted the role of technology initiatives in expanding business opportunities for African women.

== Programs and Infrastructure ==
In 2016, telecommunications provider SEACOM partnered with HiveColab to deliver a dedicated 20Mbps high-speed fiber-optic connection to the Kampala hub to support local software development teams and early-stage ventures. The organization also operates circular agribusiness acceleration programs such as O-Farms.
