= Matild Manukyan =

Turkish brothel runner (1914–2001)

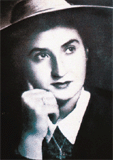
- Manukyan in the 1930s
- Born: 1914; Istanbul, Ottoman Empire
- Died: 17 February 2001 (aged 86–87); Istanbul, Turkey
- Resting place: Armenian Cemetery of Şişli
- Occupations: Real property investor, brothel owner

Matild Manukyan (Armenian: Մաթիլդ Մանուկյան; 1914 – 17 February 2001) was a wealthy Turkish businesswoman of Armenian descent. She was a real property investor and madam who made a fortune in the brothel business (legal prostitution). At one point, she became the top taxpayer in Istanbul for five consecutive years during the 1990s.

== Biography ==
She was born in 1914 to an aristocratic Armenian family in Istanbul, Ottoman Empire. After finishing the French language-high school Lycée Notre Dame de Sion Istanbul, she opened an haute couture atelier for Istanbul's socialites. Soon, she lost her husband and had to live alone with her son.

Manukyan leased the buildings she inherited from her father in the red-light district of Karaköy neighbourhood in Istanbul to brothel owners. One of the brothel owners handed over his business to her in order to settle a debt, and over the years, she expanded the number of brothels she owned to a chain of 32.

She invested her opulent earnings from the sex business into real property. Manukyan was the top taxpayer in Istanbul for five consecutive years during the 1990s and received an award for that by the revenue authority. She displayed her collection of certificates and recognition items she received from the authorities in her home in Şişli that she called the "M&M Museum".

In an interview, she revealed that she then owned around 70 business centers and 500 apartments in Istanbul, 200 in Yalova, three five-star hotels in Antalya and Alanya, 10 villas in Kyrenia, Northern Cyprus and a factory in Istanbul in the export business. She also noted that she was building a hotel in Germany with 100 beds. She also ran a fleet of around 220 taxis. Luxury items owned by Manukyan included a Rolls-Royce car, four top model Mercedes and BMW cars, and an 18 m yacht in the Kalamış Marina in Istanbul.

She was also known for her philanthropy, having donated tens of thousands of dollars from her fortune to hospitals and charities

Manukyan died on 17 February 2001, in Istanbul, at age 84 of heart failure, and was buried in the Armenian Cemetery of Şişli following the funeral at the Üç Horon Armenian Church in Beyoğlu. Her only heir is her son Kerope Çilingir, who grew up in the United States.

== Trivia ==
- On 28 September 1995, Matild Manukyan was seriously injured on her left leg in a firearm attack, which originally targeted her security guard and driver.
- Manukyan (played by Ahu Tuğba) was featured in a 2006 TV miniseries named Meçhule Gidenler (literally Those Who Go to Uncertainty) directed by Bülent Pelit. The series has not been broadcast yet.
