= J. P. Morgan (disambiguation) =

J. P. Morgan (1837–1913) was an American banking tycoon.

J. P. Morgan may also refer to:

- JPMorgan Chase, large financial services company formed through the merger of J.P. Morgan & Co. and Chase Manhattan Bank in 2000
- J.P. Morgan & Co., former banking house also known as the House of Morgan; now a subsidiary of JPMorgan Chase

== People ==
- J. P. Morgan Jr. (1867–1943), son of J. P. Morgan and American philanthropist
- J. P. Morgan (racing driver) (born 1976), American stock car racing driver
- Jaye P. Morgan (1931–2026), American singer and actress
- June P. Morgan (1917–1998), chief justice of the Supreme Court of Missouri
