= Marit Reutz =

Norwegian businessperson (born 1952)

Marit Reutz (born 21 January 1952) is a Norwegian businessperson.

She graduated with the siv.øk. degree from the Norwegian School of Economics in 1976. She started her banking career as an assistant in Bergen Bank during her studies, and after graduation she was a head of department in Tromsøysundets Sparebank from 1977 to 1979. After a period as research assistant and research fellow at the University of Tromsø from 1979 to 1983 and petroleum consultant in Troms County Municipality from 1983 to 1985, she was hired as director of personnel in Sparebanken Nord-Norge. After stints at human resources director for Sparebanken Nord-Norge from 1989 to 1991 and social security director in Troms County Municipality from 1991 to 1997, she was hired as a director in the Telenor corporation. Since 2007 she is the human resources development manager in that corporation.

She is chair of the Office for Contemporary Art Norway, deputy chair of the Norwegian Arctic Philharmonic Orchestra, and a board member of Macks Ølbryggeri, Lærdal Medical, Anthon B Nilsen Utdanning, the Norwegian School of Economics, Kristiania University College and the Norwegian Film Institute. She is a former chair of the National Library of Norway and Riksteatret, former deputy chair of Tromsø Telemetry Station, of BI Norwegian Business School and the Research Council of Norway, and former board member of Statoil, the Regional Development Fund and Statens Fiskarbank. She resides in Oslo.

Cultural offices
Preceded by Kjell Bjordal	Chair of Riksteatret; 2003–2012	Succeeded by Stephan L. Jervell
