= Vera Cordeiro =

Brazilian physician and business woman (born 1950)

Vera Cordeiro (born 1950) is a Brazilian physician and social entrepreneur. She is the founder and chair of the board of Brazil Child Health (Associação Saúde Criança).

== Biography ==
Vera Cordeiro was born in Rio de Janeiro in 1950. She received her MD as a general practitioner in 1975 from the Federal University of Rio de Janeiro (UFRJ).

From 1978 to 1998, she worked at the Hospital da Lagoa, where she established the Psychosomatic Department in 1979.

In 1991, she founded Brazil Child Health (Portuguese: Associação Saúde Criança), a social organization which promotes the long-term well-being of socially vulnerable families. Saúde Criança was named by NGO Advisor in 2018 as the best social organization in Latin America, and the 18th best in the world. The long-term effectiveness of the organization's methods was demonstrated by researchers at Georgetown University in 2013. Cordeiro has since established 23 similar NGOs near public hospitals in six Brazilian states, and other social entrepreneurs have spread the methodology in other countries, and influenced public policy in the city of Belo Horizonte.

Cordeiro is an Ashoka fellow, a Skoll Foundation awardee, Schwab Foundation social entrepreneur, and from 2005 to 2011 a board member of the PATH global health NGO.
