= Bonzun =

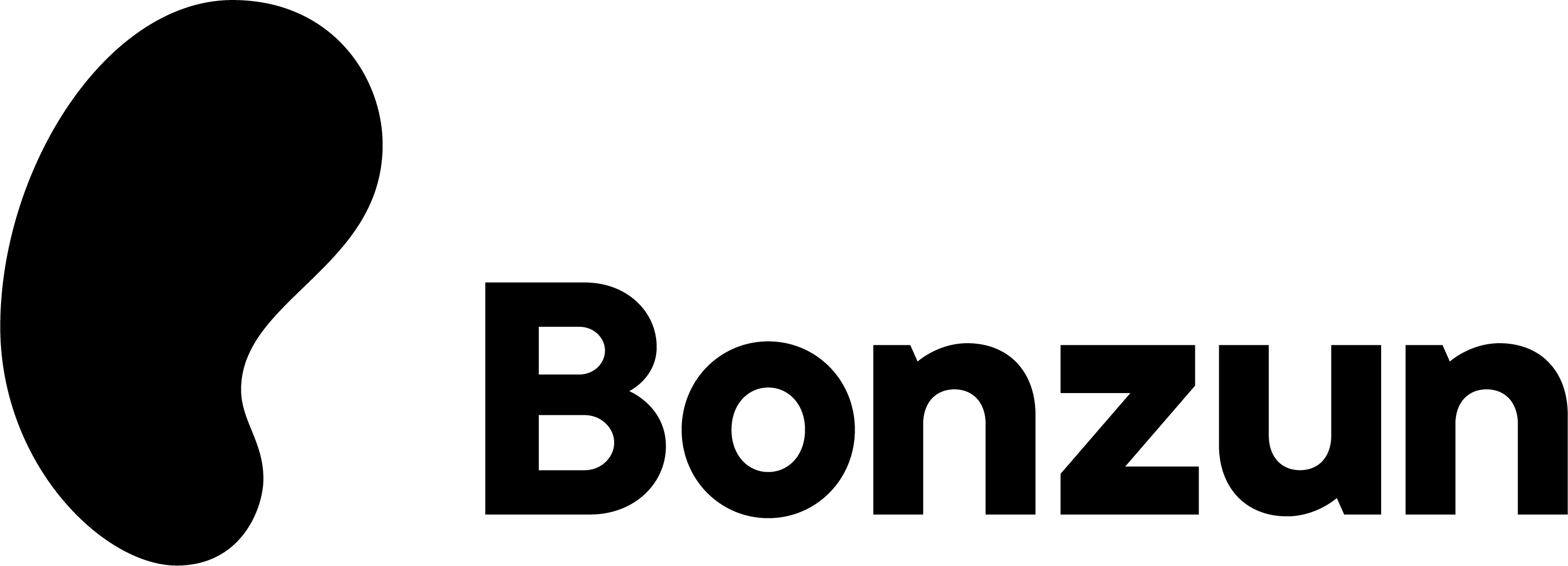
- Company type: Private
- Industry: Healthcare
- Founders: Bonnie Roupé
- Headquarters: Stockholm, Sweden
- Services: e-Health
- Website: https://www.bonzun.com/

Bonzun is a Swedish-based company, with backing from both the World Health Organization and UNICEF. Bonzun helps pregnant women get access to information previously not available online. Their main focus is pregnancy information to the Chinese people.

The success of the website and app in China has led to the founder receiving a number of awards for her innovation.

== History ==
Bonzun is a fem tech company that built the first symptom checker for pregnant women in the world, a virtual midwife that is recommended by both UNICEF and WHO. Bonzun was first founded in 2010, after Bonnie Roupé got seriously ill during the pregnancy of her second child and she could not find any information online. Bonnie Roupé and her baby survived, but she could not get over the fact that so many women around the world suffer and die because of lack of information online. She wanted to create a service to make research available to doctors and mothers all over the world. Information that helps and saves lives. Bonnie Roupe stated that around 20 million women a year fall pregnant in China, meaning there was a large market for the medical information. The website describes common and serious pregnancy complications and make information accessible in China so pregnant women and health care professionals can improve their knowledge, especially in rural areas.

Bonnie Roupé is a native of Sweden, but started the company without a local partner in mainland China. In an interview, she stated that it was a good learning curve to go through the processes alone, but admitted that it may have been faster to use a local partner.

In 2012, Bonzun was selected for the Innovation Against Poverty, which was received from the Swedish International Development Cooperation Agency (SIDA). During the same year, the company's founder Bonnie Roupé was selected as one of Sweden's super-talents under 40 years old, by the Swedish magazine, Veckans Affärer.

The company announced in 2014 that they were receiving support for their work from both the World Health Organization and United Nations’ Children's Rights & Emergency Relief Organization (UNICEF). The company's focus on the Chinese health market led the company to have its innovations present in various hospitals across China, along with 3,700 clinics.

During that year, Bonzun also created a mobile app, which is now being used by pregnant women to understand their tests at various hospitals across China.

In autumn of 2016, Bonzun participated in Chinaaccelerator´s three-month mentorship-driven program for internet startups from all over the world. The program was finalised on December 6, 2016, at Chinaccelerator Batch 10 Demo Day in Shanghai, China.

In June 2016, InspiringFifty selected Bonzun founder Bonnie Roupé as one of the Nordic region´s 50 most inspirational tech women.

In March 2017 she was listed as one of Sweden's 125 most powerful women and ranked as the 10th most powerful women entrepreneur, Trade and Industry 2017 (Veckans Affärer).

In 2019 Bonnie Roupé was awarded Founder of the Year in Sweden by the Swedish governmental agency Tillväxtverket at Demoday.

== Awards and recognition ==
- Innovation against poverty – SIDA
- Selected for the LifeScience Investment Hotlist by Stockholms Stad
- Best social business in Shanghai
- Best Design – Nominated Chinas Top Mobile & Internet Start-up GMIC Beijing 2015
- Top Mobile & Internet Start up in China - Female Innovator of the Year
- Super startup – Listed as one of Sweden's potential unicorn startup by Veckans Affärer
