= Kavli Trust =

Norwegian food company

O. Kavli og Knut Kavlis Almennyttige Fond
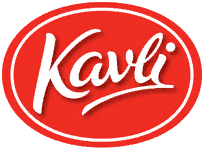
- Company type: Foundation
- Industry: Food
- Founded: 1890
- Headquarters: Bergen, Norway
- Revenue: ▲NOK 1.3 billion (2004)
- Number of employees: 560 (2004)
- Website: www.kavlifondet.no

Kavli Trust (Norwegian: Kavlifondet or O. Kavli og Knut Kavlis Almennyttige Fond in full) is a Norwegian foundation based in Bergen that owns Kavli Holding AS that in its turn, owns major food brands including Kavli and Q-meieriene.

Kavli Holding AS. Bergen, the Norwegian food group founded in 1893 by Olav Kavli as a wholesale company in cheese products. Kavli exports began around 1910, when the company was first introduced on the Norwegian-American market in the U.S. with exports such as goat cheese. Just before the World War I began, Kavli began to produce more of the goods themselves, both canned and cheeses. In 1920, Kavli introduced Primula, a mild cheese with great durability (smelteost) . Today, the company sells produce in 30 countries from plants located in Norway, Sweden, Denmark, Finland, England and Scotland.

After the death of his father in 1958, Knut Kavli (1890-1965) bought up most shares in the O. Kavli A / S. Kavli Foundation was created 25 April 1962, when Knut Kavli transferred his shares in the family company to the foundation. The purpose of the foundation is to provide funding for culture, science and charity. The foundations operations span twenty countries.
