= Hanne Refsholt =

Norwegian agronomist and businessperson (born 1960)

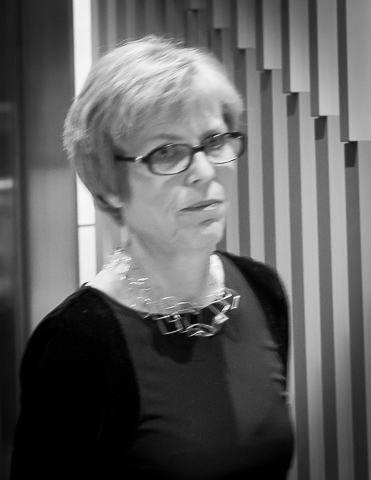
Hanne Refsholt in 2016

Hanne Refsholt (born November 16, 1960 in Larvik) is a Norwegian agronomist and businessperson. She is the former CEO of TINE (until 2018) and former chair of Domstein.

== Career ==
Refsholt is educated with a Master in Agronomy from the Norwegian College of Agriculture and a Master in Business Administration from the Norwegian School of Management. She started working in research and development for TINE in 1988, and later became director of product development. From 1996-98 she was Director of the Norwegian Independent Meat and Poultry Association, but returned to TINE in 1998. She became an executive officer in 2001 and CEO in 2005. In 2007, the newspaper Nationen declared her the most powerful women in the Norwegian agricultural sector. She is also a board member of the Grocery Manufacturers of Norway.
