= Barbara Birungi =

Ugandan technologist and corporate executive

Barbara Birungi Mutabazi
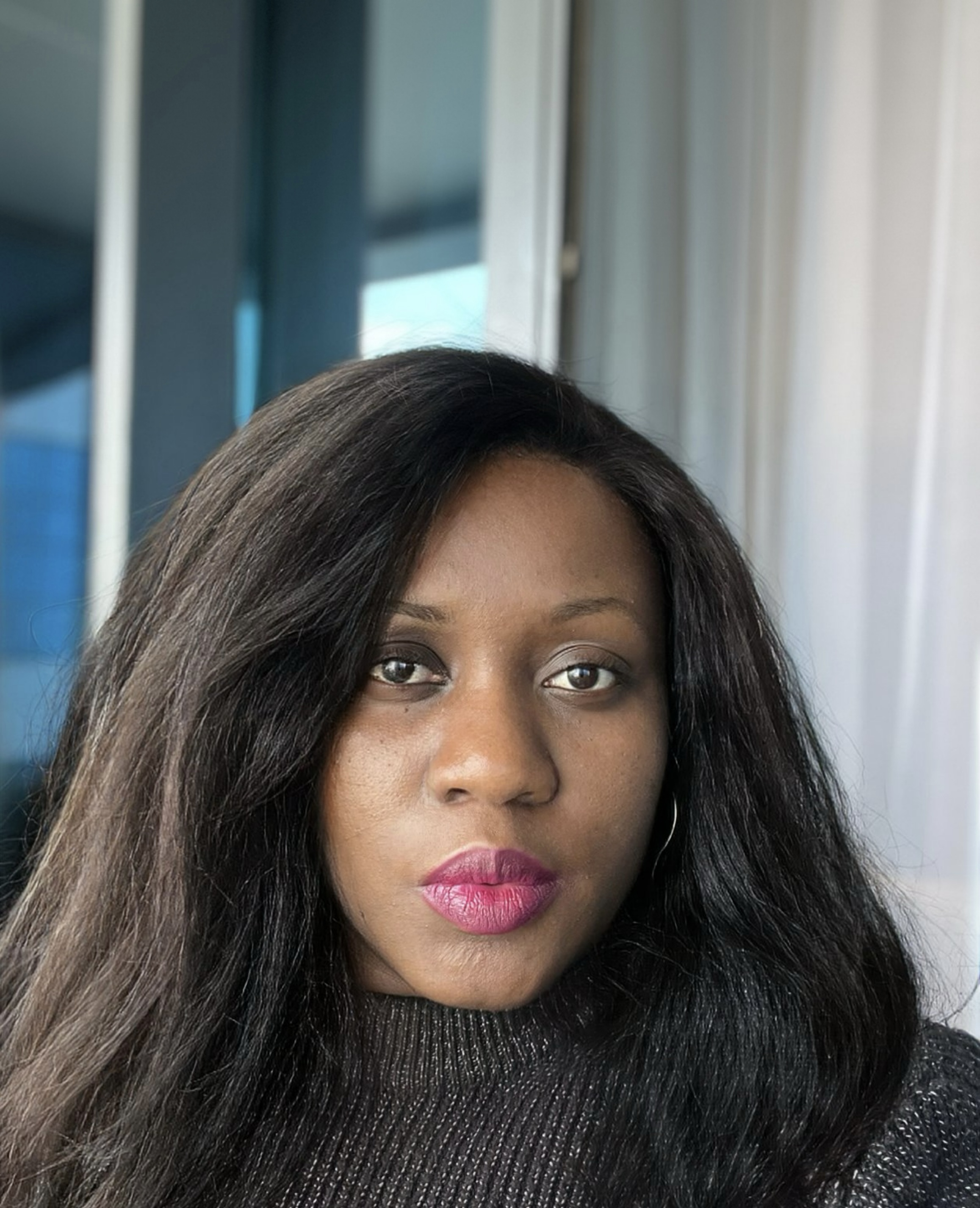
- Birungi in 2024
- Born: 7 August 1986 (age 39)
- Education: Makerere University Business School; MIT Sloan School of Management
- Occupation: Technologist

Barbara (Birungi) Mutabazi (born 7 August 1986) is a Ugandan technologist, entrepreneur, and mentor. She is a co-founder and founding manager of HiveColab in Kampala, Uganda. She is the founder of Women in Technology Uganda, an initiative aimed at helping women and girls pursue technology careers. Prior to Hive Colab, Mutabazi was a member of staff at the African technology firm Appfrica.

== Early life and education ==
Barbara Birungi Mutabazi was born in Uganda. She pursued a degree in Information Technology at Makerere University. In 2024, she graduated from the MIT Sloan School of Management with an SFMBA degree, where she focused on management technology and received the prestigious Sloan Fellows Global Scholars Fund Fellowship.

== Personal life ==
Mutabazi lives in Kampala, Uganda. She has four children.
