= Camilla Ley Valentin =

Danish business executive

Camilla Ley Valentin is Danish business executive who co-founded and, as of September 2015, is the chief communications officer of the internet queuing system Queue-it. She is the daughter of the composer and television host Hans-Henrik Ley (1923–2014).

Ley Valentin ascribes her success to her father's inspiration and to the training she received while working for A.P. Møller-Mærsk. After becoming interested in the Internet, she earned an MBA from Heriot Watt University in Scotland. She then spent a constructive period working for the IT department of Nykredit, but she began looking for a position where her work reflected her own creativity. This led her to join Fourkant in Copenhagen where she had the opportunity to concentrate on the Queue-it Internet application which she co-founded in 2010. The system is designed to resolve end-user overload in order to prevent website failure.

In 2012, Ley Valentin became the first woman in IT to receive the Danish "Female Entrepreneur of the Year" award hosted by Deloitte.

In connection with her award, Ley Valentin explained: "My childhood home was immersed in a spirit of creativity, industriousness and achievement." For Trendsonline, she added: "There is not a single day that I go home without learning something, creating something or meeting inspiring people. That probably explains why I've kept working in the business for almost 15 years."

== Awards and recognitions ==
- In 2016, Ley Valentin was named one of the 50 Inspiring Women in Tech the Nordics.
- In 2018, Ley Valentin was listed by Forbes as 100 Women Founders In Europe to Follow on Twitter and LinkedIn.
