= Tatsuuma Kiyo =

Tatsuuma Kiyo, born on July 16, 1809, was the daughter of a Nishinomiya brewing family, who in the nineteenth century built the largest sake empire in Japan. For many generations, the Tatsuuma house had produced sake and barrels in Nishinomiya. By the beginning of the nineteenth century, Tatsuuma had become a relatively large brewery under Tatsuuma Kichizaemon IX, Kiyo's father.

== Life ==
Born in 1809, Kiyo was the only child of Tatsuuma Kichizaemon IX. As a child, Kiyo learned and observed the family business, which made her very knowledgeable about the sake industry. In 1830, Kiyo married the son of another brewing house, and in 1842, he assumed the headship of her family as Kichizaemon X. As a married couple, they had many children. Records only show six, but some sources state that she had as many as twelve. Kiyo’s husband died in 1855, and her eldest son took over as the headship of the family.

For the next fifty years, the Tatsuuma brewery, called Hakushika, prospered greatly. Kiyo never assumed family headship, but she was the power behind them. Women were not allowed inside the brewery, but Kiyo learned to supervise the workers closely. Under her leadership, Hakushika grew to be the largest sake empire in Japan. By 1894, the brewery had an output of 22,000 koku annually, three times larger than the nearest competitor. Under her watch, the brewery underwent many innovations that contributed to its success.

Kiyo expanded the company by purchasing her own ships to transport sake, eventually starting her own shipping company. Kiyo also began marine and fire insurance companies, and established an exchange and finance facility.

Kiyo was savvy not only in business, but also in the marriage arrangements she made for her children. Through her strategy of founding branch families, sending out sons to be adopted, and marrying daughters to other brewing houses, she created her own family empire in the sake industry.

Kiyo died in 1900, after she expanded the Tatsuuma family enterprises as the largest brewer and shipper of sake in an era when sake was Japan’s major industry.
