= Sveta Planman =

Russian-born Finnish fashion designer

Sveta Planman (born 1979) is a Russian-born Finnish fashion designer and entrepreneur. She is the CEO and designer of JOLIER transformable fashion brand, created in Helsinki in 2008.

Planman started her studies within the field of fashion at Hämeen Institute for Vocational Education, then continuing to Wetterhoff at Hämeen University of Applied Science. In 2003-2004 Planman studied at NABA – Nuova Accademia di Belle Arti Milano, Italy. After graduating as a fashion designer from the University of Art and Design Helsinki (Master of Arts) in 2005, Planman launched her first collection.

Besides designing, Planman makes all patterns herself, and said: “Transformability in clothing has always intrigued me and I wanted to create something new. It was important to be able to respond to challenges fashion world is currently facing; size problems, short time of use and sustainability”.

In 2009 Planman participated in Venture Cup business competition. The Jolier brand was awarded as an innovative concept and was chosen in the Top 10 list of business plans in Finland.
