= Karin Refsnes =

Norwegian civil servant

Karin Helene Rosenberg Refsnes (born 10 June 1947) is a Norwegian civil servant and businessperson.

She was born in Sweden, but took her degree in bioengineering at the Norwegian Institute of Technology in 1970. She took the dr.philos. degree at the University of Oslo in 1979. She worked as a cancer researcher from 1972 to 1977, in the Norwegian Pollution Control Authority from 1977 to 1989, as deputy under-secretary of state in the Norwegian Ministry of the Environment from 1989 and later in Det Norske Veritas. In the summer of 1997 she was hired as director of the environment and development in the Research Council of Norway. In 2003 the Research Council was reorganized and Refsnes became director of the strategic division.

She had formerly been a council member of the NTNF. She has been a member of the board of directors of Enova and Kings Bay.
