= Bonnie Roupé =

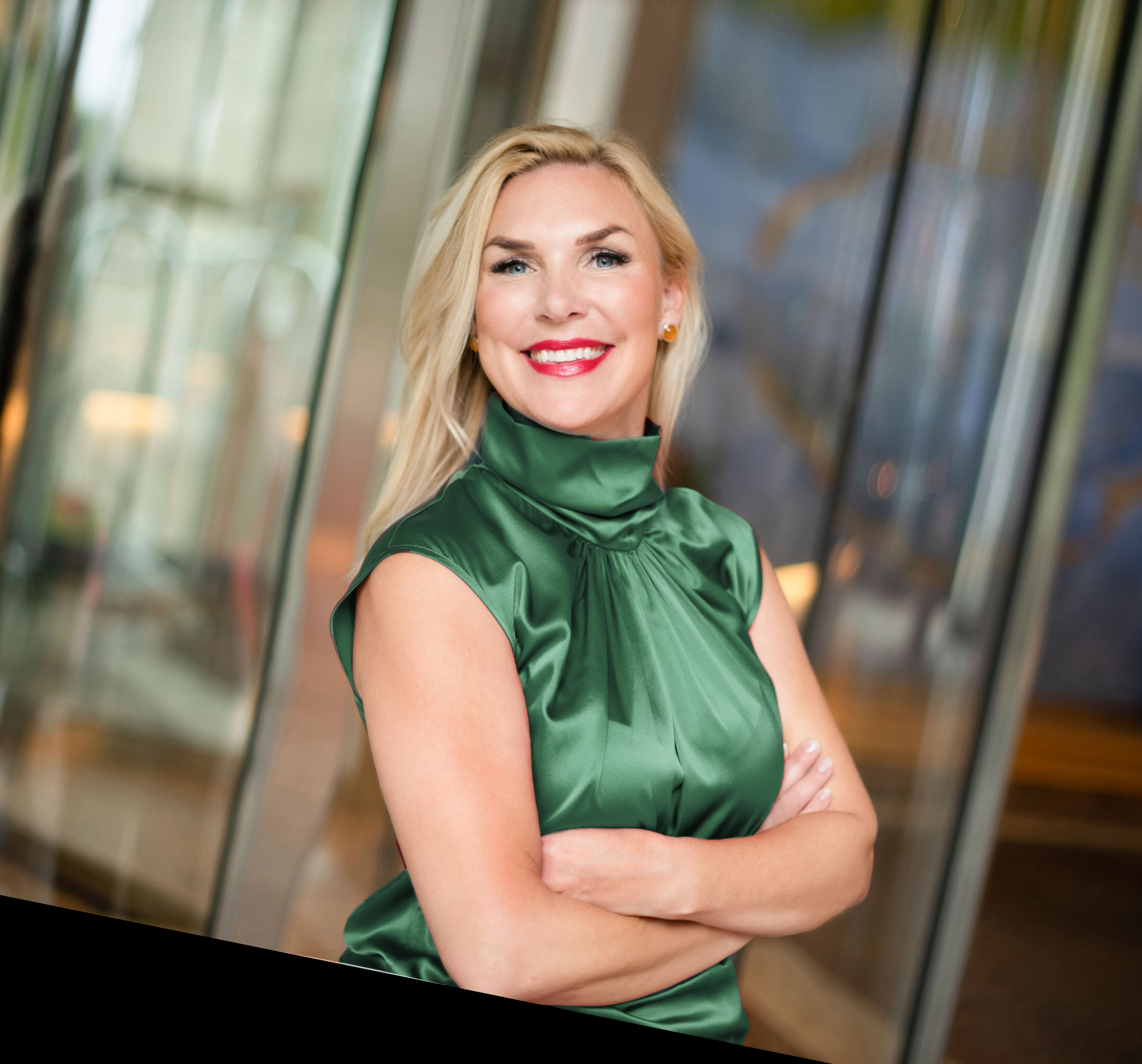
- Born: January 14, 1976 (age 50); Stockholm, Sweden
- Occupation: Businesswoman
- Known for: Bonzun, Kexuema App

Bonnie Roupé (simplified Chinese 柔向盈) is a Swedish-born international businesswoman and social entrepreneur, best known as the founder of Bonzun, a health company providing pregnant women and parents with unbiased, evidence-based medical information.

Roupé is also known for her contribution to the Kexuema App. This blood testing application was launched together with state-owned hospitals in Beijing, China, such as the Obstetrics and Gynecology Hospital.

In 2004, she started and founded the Red Tee, the first niche golf magazine for women. In 2005, she was named the most promising entrepreneur of the Year in Sweden, and in 2012, she was listed as one of Sweden's super talents by veckans affärer. Bonzun was awarded the emblem of Innovation Against Poverty by SIDA in 2012 for its contribution to distributing medical information in China.

== Awards and recognition ==
- 2005 - Most Promising Entrepreneur Affärsvärlden
- 2012 - Supertalent Veckans Affärer
