= Muriel Anton =

Czech economist and business executive

- Education: University of Alberta (BCom, MA)
- Occupations: Economist, business executive
- Title: CEO of Vodafone Czech Republic
- Term: Until October 2013
- Successor: Balesh Sharma

Muriel Anton is a Czech economist and business executive, who was the CEO of Vodafone Czech Republic to October 2013. Anton studied for a bachelor's degree in Commerce and a Masters of Arts in Economics at the University of Alberta, in Canada. From 1988 to 1991, she lectured there in intermediate and introductory macroeconomics at the Faculty of Economics. After numerous positions in financial planning and analysis management at telecommunications companies, she joined Oskar in January 2000. She was later appointed Director of Vodafone Czech Republic. In October 2013, she was succeeded by Balesh Sharma.
