= Margareth Øvrum =

Norwegian engineer and business executive

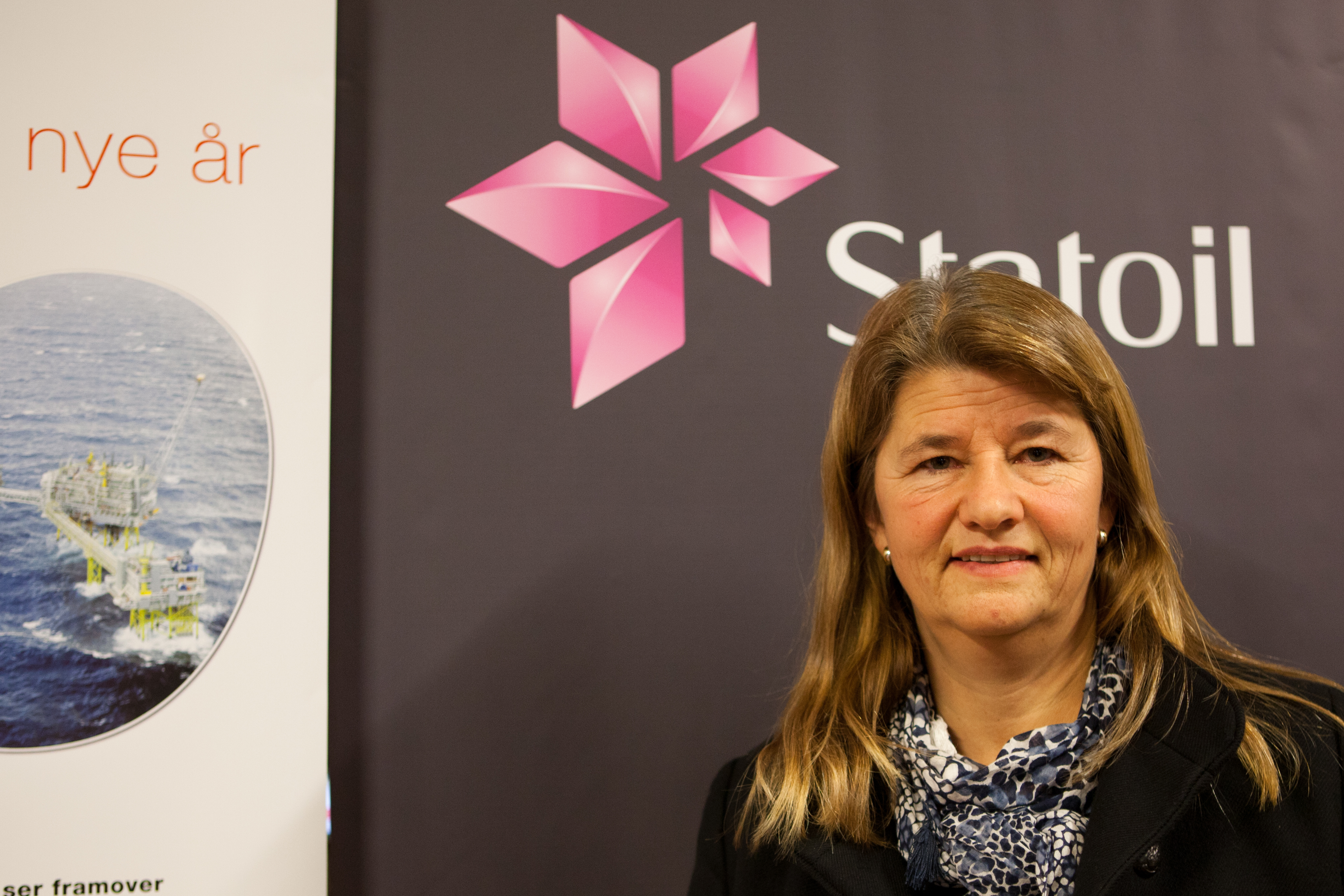
Margareth Øvrum

Margareth Øvrum (born 19 September 1958) is a Norwegian engineer and business executive. Since 1982 she has worked for Statoil where she was an executive vice-president from 2004 to 2020.

Born in Skien in the south of Norway. In 1981, she graduated with a 4.5 year degree (sivilingeniør) in engineering from the Norwegian Institute of Technology in Trondheim, specializing in Engineering Physics. In 1982, she began working for Statoil where she became the company's first female platform manager while she was working at the Gullfaks Field. She then became senior vice-president for operations at the Velsefrikk oil field and vice-president of operations support for the Norwegian continental shelf. She is currently Statoil's Executive Vice President of Technology, Projects & Drilling.

In 2013, Øvrum was named "Oilman of the Year" by the Society of Petroleum Engineers. The same year, in commemoration of the 100th anniversary of universal suffrage in Norway, Øvrum was voted the Most Influential Woman in Technology.

Øvrum was also a member of the board of directors at Atlas Copco from 2008 to 2017. She is also a director of the University of Bergen and has served on the board of the Storebrand financial services company. She has held directorships with Ratos, Elkem and Siemens Norge.

Margareth Øvrum has lived in Bergen since 1987. After working for three years offshore, she returned to Norway in 2020.
