= Brazil Child Health =

Organization

- Founded: 1991
- Founder: Vera Cordeiro
- Location: Rio de Janeiro
- Region served: Brazil
- Product: Post-hospitalization care
- Website: brazilchildhealth.org saudecrianca.org.br

Brazil Child Health (Associação Saúde Criança and formerly Renascer) is a Brazilian nonprofit organization that works to break the cycle of hospital readmissions of critically ill children from low-income backgrounds. It recognizes that illnesses are not simply matters of biology but are rooted in socioeconomic factors that aggravate and perpetuate the disease. To go beyond medical treatment and to secure patient health for the long term, Associação Saúde Criança espouses a biopsychosocial model of healthcare that provides comprehensive post-hospitalization care and aims to bring the family out of poverty. It has an office based in New York City under the name Brazil Child Health that is a 501(c)(3) non-profit and coordinates international fundraising for the organization.

== History ==
Associação Saúde Criança was founded in 1991 by Vera Cordeiro. While a physician in the pediatric department at Hospital da Lagoa in Rio de Janeiro, she saw many of her patients fall into a cycle of hospitalization, treatment, discharge, reinfection, and rehospitalization. She realized that treatments given at the hospital were ineffective if her patients simply returned to the environments that made them sick in the first place. In response, she began Associação Saúde Criança out of her own home with a handful of volunteers in order to provide for families the items required to keep them healthy outside of the hospital, such as food, clothing, and financial support.

Saúde Criança has since expanded, with a wide network that ranges across six states in Brazil. Its efforts have been celebrated both in Brazil and by the international community.

== Family backgrounds ==
Saúde Criança works with families from some of the most disadvantaged neighborhoods in Rio de Janeiro and all over Brazil. The typical family assisted by the program comes from a favela and lives in poverty with little access to government resources. In this context, acute and chronic medical conditions have severe and long-lasting consequences on not only the family's health but its overall welfare as well. Frequently, the decision to purchase medicine or continue treatment for a sick child means being unable to buy food for the rest of the family. Even if the expensive treatments are purchased, they are rendered ineffective when the child returns to the dirty alleyways and cramped housing characteristic of most houses in a favela. Thus, families become poorer, both financially and in spirit, while their health conditions stagnate or even worsen.

== Methodology ==
Saúde Criança's methodology revolves around the Family Action Plan, a 2-year blueprint that outlines all of the major goals a family should aim to achieve in the realms of housing, income generation, education, citizenship, and health. It is created shortly after the family has been identified by and referred to Saúde Criança from a partnering hospital. Saúde Criança volunteers interview the family to gain a better sense of its background and together they establish the objectives of the plan.

Though each plan is tailored to the individual needs of the families, Saúde Criança maintains a minimum set of standards that any family must achieve in order to be considered healthy and to graduate from the program. The goals and strategies differ according to the area of health they address.

- Health: Saúde Criança works with the family and provides specialized food, medicine, and technical support to ensure that the child's chronic or acute illness is well-managed. The main goal is that every child in the family is at least in satisfactory condition, as defined by the hospital.
- Housing: Houses that are in poor condition and not located in hazardous areas undergo repairs using materials and labor provided by Saúde Criança. The goal is to ensure that the homes have basic amenities, such as access to water, sewage, painted walls, and a roof without leakages, in order to provide an environment conducive to the child's health.
- Income Generation: Family members (particularly mothers) are enrolled in professional training courses, according to their personal abilities and interests. The main purpose is to teach marketable skills to families in order to ensure stable and higher incomes upon graduation. Saúde Criança offers workshops internally for professional qualification as well as access to courses provided by external organizations. Moreover, Saúde Criança donates tools and other resources to support enterprise development.
- Citizenship: Saúde Criança facilitates families in obtaining official registration documentation so that they may access government social service programs. Families also receive legal advice in matters such as land tenure, divorces, and different types of legal disputes.
- Education: Parents attend educational and preventive lectures on issues such as nutrition, hygiene, violence and domestic accidents, infant development, adolescence, family planning, sexually transmitted disease, AIDS, and basic care. In addition, all children in the family between the ages of 5 and 17 must be enrolled in school.

== Impact ==
An Evaluation of Long Term Impact, conducted by Georgetown University in 2013, analyzed the assisted families three to five years after the Family Action Plan conclusion date. The study revealed a 92% increase in family income and over 90% increase in home ownership. There were an increase in the percentage of families identifying their wellbeing as “good” or “very good,” from 9.6% before ASC to 51.2% after graduating ASC. At the same time, there was a 73% decrease in the percentage of families identifying their wellbeing as “bad” or “very bad,” from 56.0% before ASC to 15.2% after graduating ASC. The study also found an 86% decrease in the average number of days children spent in the hospital, with a significant drop in costs for the public health system.

== Expansion ==
The successful experience of the Family Action Plan with families referred from Hospital da Lagoa, Maternity Hospital Maria Amélia Buarque de Holanda and the National Institute of Cardiology - partner institutions of the Saúde Criança - has attracted interest from other organizations and institutions in Brazil and abroad.

To disseminate 26 years of experience with the Family Action Plan, Saúde Criança carries out permanent evaluations, records information and data, and maintains a strict control of the process and development of each family served.

The methodology has already been reproduced in 24 organizations that work with hospitals and other public units in several Brazilian states, and adapted to a human development program by the city of Belo Horizonte.

The methodology can also be adapted to other institutional and cultural contexts where poverty is the challenge. It offers training, internships and exchanges for people interested in implementing the Family Action Plan, and for students and professionals from universities in Brazil and abroad.

ASC invests in research and development of better ways of applying the methodology, offers consulting services, holds meetings and seminars with social entrepreneurs, companies, foundations and governments. In this way, it seeks to broaden and exchange ideas and proposals for innovation in health and social transformation.

Currently, work is under way to transfer the program to organizations in the United States and Portugal. In addition, The Plan has served as an inspiration for the implementation of programs in Africa, Asia, Latin America and Europe.

=== Social franchise ===
Saúde Criança has inspired the formation of 23 other organizations that have adopted its methodology, such as Refazer, Repartir, and Reacender. To consolidate its brand, in 2010, it transformed itself into a social franchise and now counts 11 branches in six states in Brazil.

=== Public policy ===
The municipality of Belo Horizonte in Minas Gerais has officially incorporated Saúde Criança's methodology into its public health program, "Família Cidadã: Cidade Solidaria." Saúde Criança is currently working with the municipalities of Rio de Janeiro, R.J. and Florianopolis, S.C., on similar pilot programs.
