= Maggie Shah =

Maggie Shah (Born 1951 in USA) is an entrepreneur, industrialist, and social worker in Nepal. She holds nearly a dozen liquor and distillery industries.

Shah's company owns around 70% of the Himalayan Distillery Limited, a major liquor group in Nepal. In 1978, she became a part of the company and later became the managing director in 1985, while her husband, worked on the technical side of the company. In 2000, her son replaced her.

Presently, Shah is involved in charities centered on female empowerment. She is in executive bodies of various organizations such as Tewa, Women Enterprise Association Nepal (WEAN), and the Sericulture Association Nepal (SAN). In 2022 Shah received a Lifetime Achievement Award during the NewBiz Business Women Summit and Awards.

== Personal life ==
Shah was born in the United States and was married to Vijay Shah, a citizen of Nepal. They met when she was a nursing student, and he was an engineering student studying at Xavier University in Cincinnati. After marriage they settled in Nepal where she learnt Nepali language. Vijaya Shah's family has been involved in the distillery business.
