= Mariana Gheorghe =

Romanian businesswoman (born 1956)

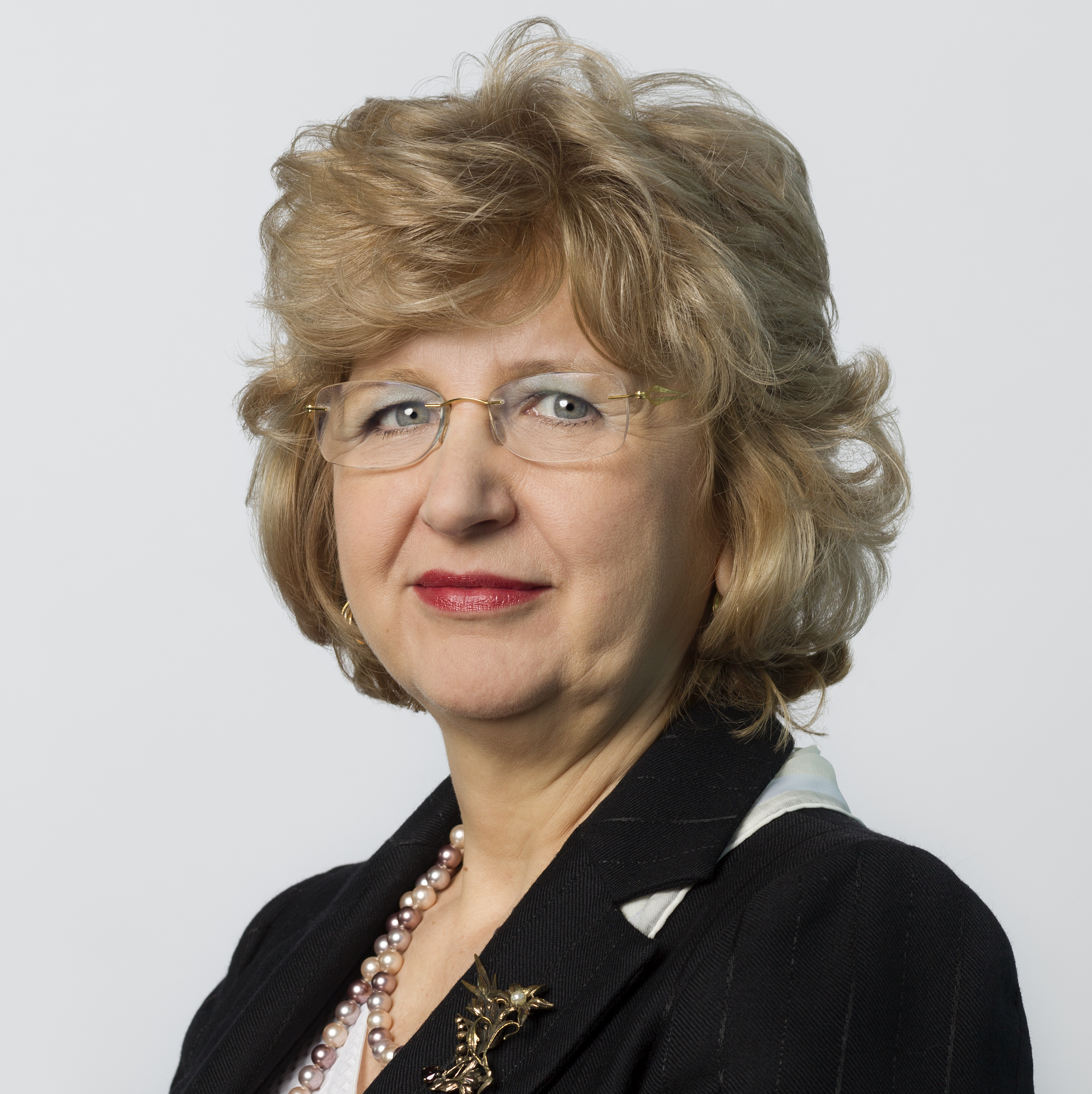
- Occupations: CEO and President of the OMV Petrom SA Directorate

Mariana Gheorghe (born 1956) is the first woman general manager of Petrom. Since the 15 June 2006, Mariana Gheorghe was the general executive director of PETROM, replacing Gheorghe Constantinescu who was named councilor for the president of OMV, Wolfgang Ruttenstorfer.

== Biography ==
=== Education ===
Mariana Gheorghe graduated from the Faculty of International Relations of the Bucharest Academy of Economic Studies in 1979. Ten years later she graduated from the Faculty of Law of the University of Bucharest in 1989 and she took the Corporate Finance Program at the London Business School in 1995.

=== Professional experience ===
Mariana Gheorghe started her career in 1979, working in two Romanian companies, Policolor and Chimica / Romferchim until 1991. Between 1991 and 1993, she worked for the Romanian Ministry of Finance, where she was second-in-command to the General Director of the International Finance Department. Beginning in 1993, she worked for the European Bank of Reconstruction and Development, first as Associated Banker, Main Banker and then as Senior Banker for Southeastern Europe, Caspian Region and Caucasus. After Petrom was privatised in 2004, Mariana Gheorghe became a Member of the Administration Council of Petrom representing EBRD until the 15th of June 2006 when was named General Executive Director of Petrom. Since the 17th of April 2007, Mariana Gheorghe also holds the position of President of the Petrom Directorate, following the adoption of a dual governing system by Petrom. She left her role as CEO of Petrom in 2018, when she was replaced by Christina Verchere.

=== Prizes ===
- Mariana Gheorghe is the first Romanian executive and the only manager in Southeastern Europe to enter the Most Powerful Women in the Business list, compiled by Fortune magazine, in 27th place.
- Mariana Gheorghe was named CEO of the Year 2012 by The Marketer magazine.
- Mariana Gheorghe ranked 1st in the Top Successful Women list made by Unica magazine.
- Mariana Gheorghe was named Most admired CEO by Business Magazine for 2 years in a row (2010 and 2011).
- Mariana Gheorghe was named Most influent woman in Romania by Forbes Romania in 2012 and 2013.
- Mariana Gheorghe ranked 1st in the Business Leader of the Year list, made by Business Review magazine.
- Mariana Gheorghe received the Doctor Honoris Causa Beneficiorul Publicorum distinction from the West University of Timișoara, Faculty of Economics and Business Administration in 2014.
- Mariana Gheorghe ranked 5th in Top most influential women in Romania, list made by Forbes Romania in 2014.

=== Organization memberships ===
- Member of the Board of Directors in the Foreign Investors Council (FIC) in Romania since May 2012. She was FIC president in 2010 and 2011.

The Foreign Investors Council (FIC) reunites 123 multinational companies, represented by presidents and executive directors. Since its inception, the Foreign Investors Council has been a constant presence in the dialogue regarding economic growth, the increase of investments and the development of the business environment.

- President of the Institute for Corporate Governance (ICG).
- Vice-President Aspen Institute Romania.
- Member of the World Energy Council (WEC).
- Member of the Romanian Association of the Roma Club (RAoRC).

== Bibliography ==
- Source: wall-street.ro
