= Samantha Aquim =

Brazilian chef

Samantha Aquim is a Brazilian chef, owner of Aquim Gastronomia in Ipanema, Rio de Janeiro and founder of Q-Zero Chocolate.

== Early life and education ==
Samantha Aquim was born and grew up in Rio de Janeiro, Brazil. She graduated Pontifical Catholic University of Rio de Janeiro with a doctorate in psychology. She then studied in France at the Culinary Institute LeNôtre.

== Career ==
=== Q-Zero Chocolate ===
Aquim is the founder of Q-Zero Chocolate, a luxury chocolate made of cocoa from Bahia, Brazil that sells for up to $15,000 a box. In 2012 at The Northwest Chocolate Festival in Seattle, it was named one of the top chocolates in the world.
