= Myngle =

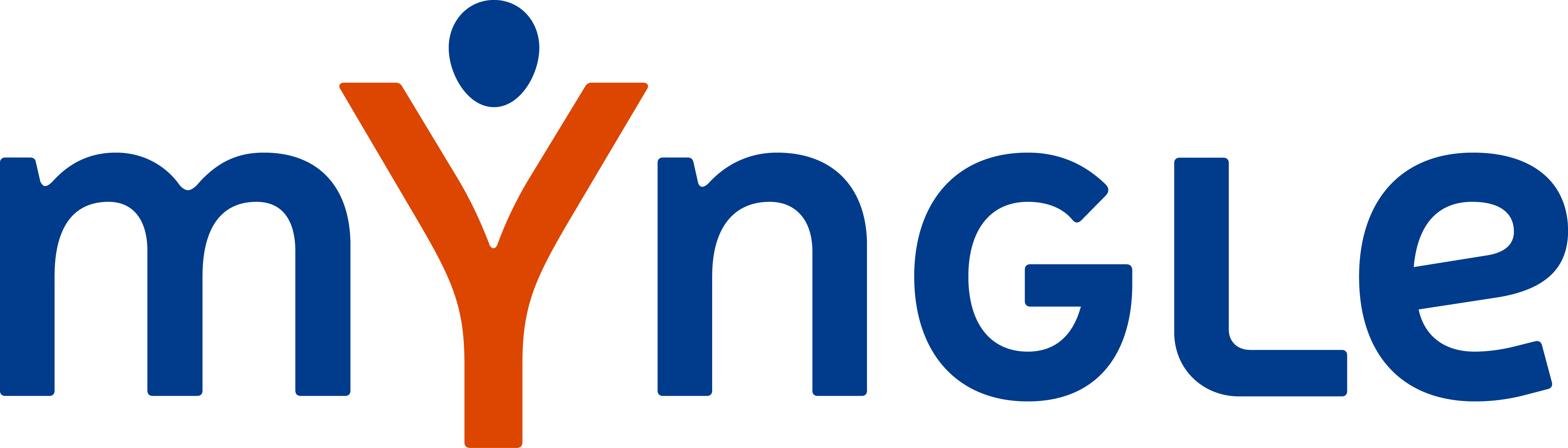
- Website type: Virtual education
- Available in: English, Spanish (Castellano), French, German, Italian, Russian,
- Owners: Myngle, inc.
- Creators: Marina Tognetti, Egbert van Keulen, Danilo da Silva, Valter Stoiani
- Website: www.myngle.com
- Commercial: Yes
- Registration: Required
- Launched: Dec 2007
- Current status: official/paying

mYngle is a Dutch online language learning website for business professionals. Based in the Netherlands, they provide one to one lessons through an online virtual classroom.

== History ==
In March 2009, Myngle secured €950,000 ($1.25 million) in the form of a bank loan from Rabobank. The Dutch government, through an innovation program, backed the loan. This was Myngle's second round of financing. On the first round Myngle was able to secure an €800,000 seed investment from the HenQ fund and private individuals.

== Recognition ==
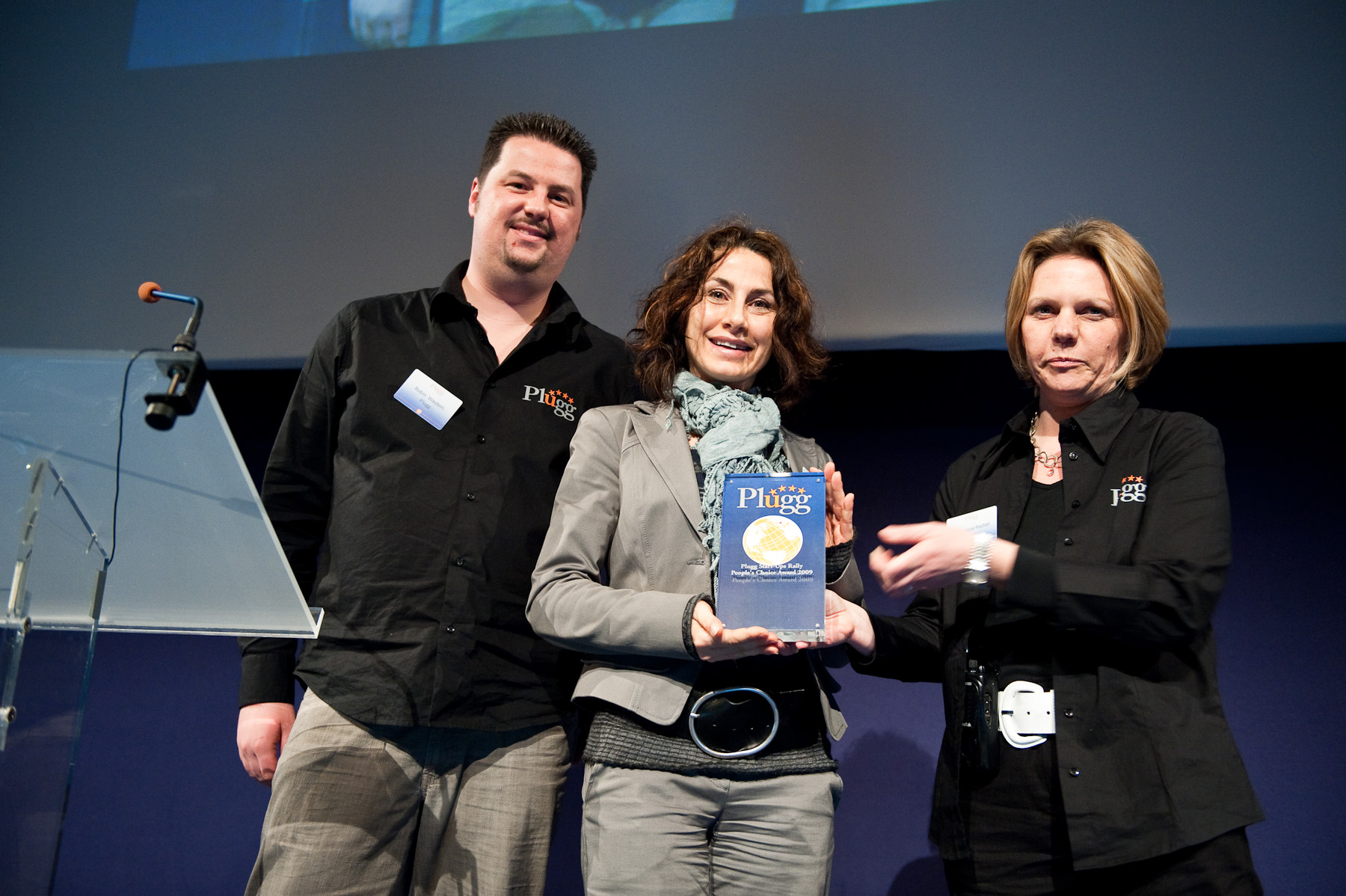
Marina Tognetti receiving the Plugg People's Choice Award, 2009

- FEM Business Top 5 Start up Media in the Netherlands, in June 2009
- Plugg Conference's People's choice award, in March 2009
- Best ICT Company at the European Venture Summit, in December 2008
- Accenture Innovation award in October 2008
