= Nicole Rodrigues =

Indian entrepreneur (born 1973)

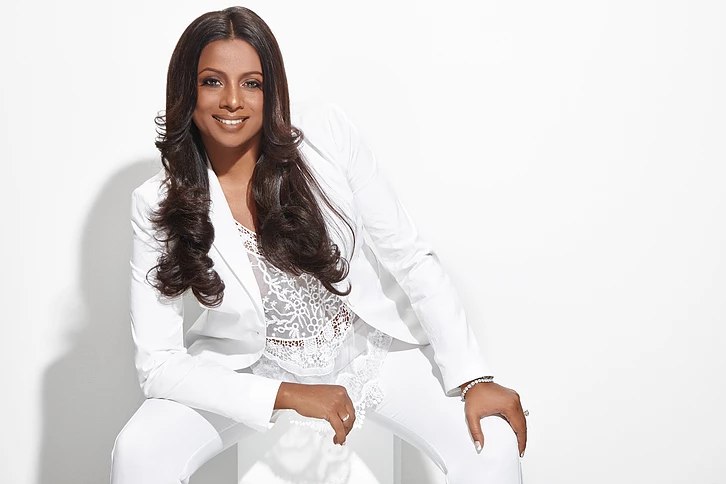
- Rodrigues in 2020
- Born: 20 March 1973 (age 53); Bombay, Maharashtra, India
- Education: Harvard
- Occupation: Entrepreneur
- Title: CEO & Founder Diva Group of Companies
- Partner: Henrik Larsen
- Children: 2
- Website: nicolerodriguesdubai.com

Nicole Rodrigues (born 20 March 1973) is an Indian entrepreneur based in Dubai, UAE. She is the founder and CEO of Diva Group of Companies. She launched Diva Modelling and Events in 2003. After the success of her modelling agency, the company branched out into real estate by starting Diva Holdings. As of March 2022, her net worth is estimated at USD 292 million.

== Early life ==
Nicole Rodrigues was born and raised in Bombay, Maharashtra, India. At age 16, she started her career in modeling. She participated in various inter-college fashion shows and was eventually discovered by Vikram Phadnis, a fashion designer who launched her as a professional model. She then appeared on the covers of various leading magazines like Femina and Health and Nutrition.

== Career ==
In 1995, Rodrigues moved to Bahrain when she began working for Gulf Air. There she met, Henrik Larsen, and later moved to Copenhagen after their first child was born.

In 2010, Rodrigues' company established NM Investments and further expanded its horizons by venturing into consulting and accounting services. By 2011, Rodrigues added two more business lines, Diva Laundry and Diva Salon. In 2015, she was recognised in the Outstanding Category at the Asia Pacific Entrepreneurship Awards. In 2014, Rodrigues was acknowledged as one of the Forbes Top Indian Leaders in the Arab World. She also won the CEO of the year at the CEO Awards in 2014. Today, Diva Group of companies is capitalizing on its home grown success and expanding its operations to Qatar, Kuwait, Doha, Bahrain, Turkey, India and Pakistan.

== Personal life ==
Nicole Rodrigues has two children: a daughter, Victoria Larsen (born 8 September 2002), and a son, Victor Larsen (born 21 September 2005). As of 2026, Victoria Larsen has graduated from Syracuse University in the United States and is involved in the family business, while her son studies business and entrepreneurship at Babson College in Boston. Rodrigues resides in Dubai, United Arab Emirates.
