= Gro Brækken =

Norwegian businesswoman

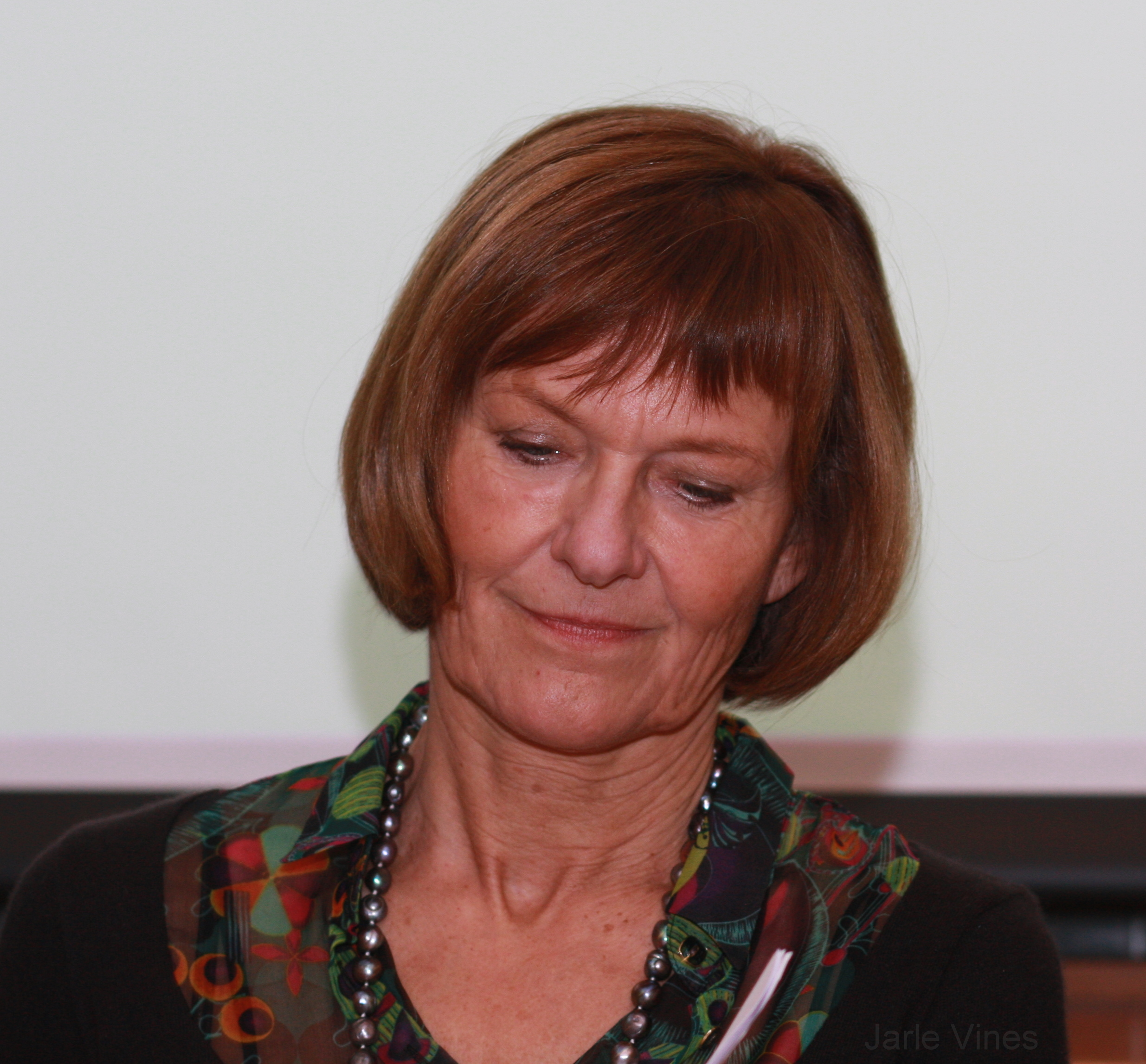
Gro Brækken 2010.

Gro Merete Brækken (born 8 December 1952) is a Norwegian businessperson known for her extensive leadership experience in various sectors including oil, refinery, natural gas, shipbuilding, banking, and aid and development. She has held significant roles in both national and international companies and organizations.

== Early life and education ==
Brækken was born in Narvik and spent her youth in Mo i Rana, Moss, and Trondheim. She graduated with a MSc in Chemical Engineering from the Norwegian Institute of Technology in 1975.

== Career ==
Brækken's career spans several industries and leadership positions. She started her career at Norske Shell (1976–1982), followed by a role as Head of Dept. Gas Sales Administration at Statoil in Stavanger (1982–1988). She then served as the CEO of Ulstein International (1988–1990), where she was responsible for ship design, international sales, and marketing. Her tenure at Den norske Bank (1990–1994) included the position of Regional Managing Director for Oslo & Akershus private market.

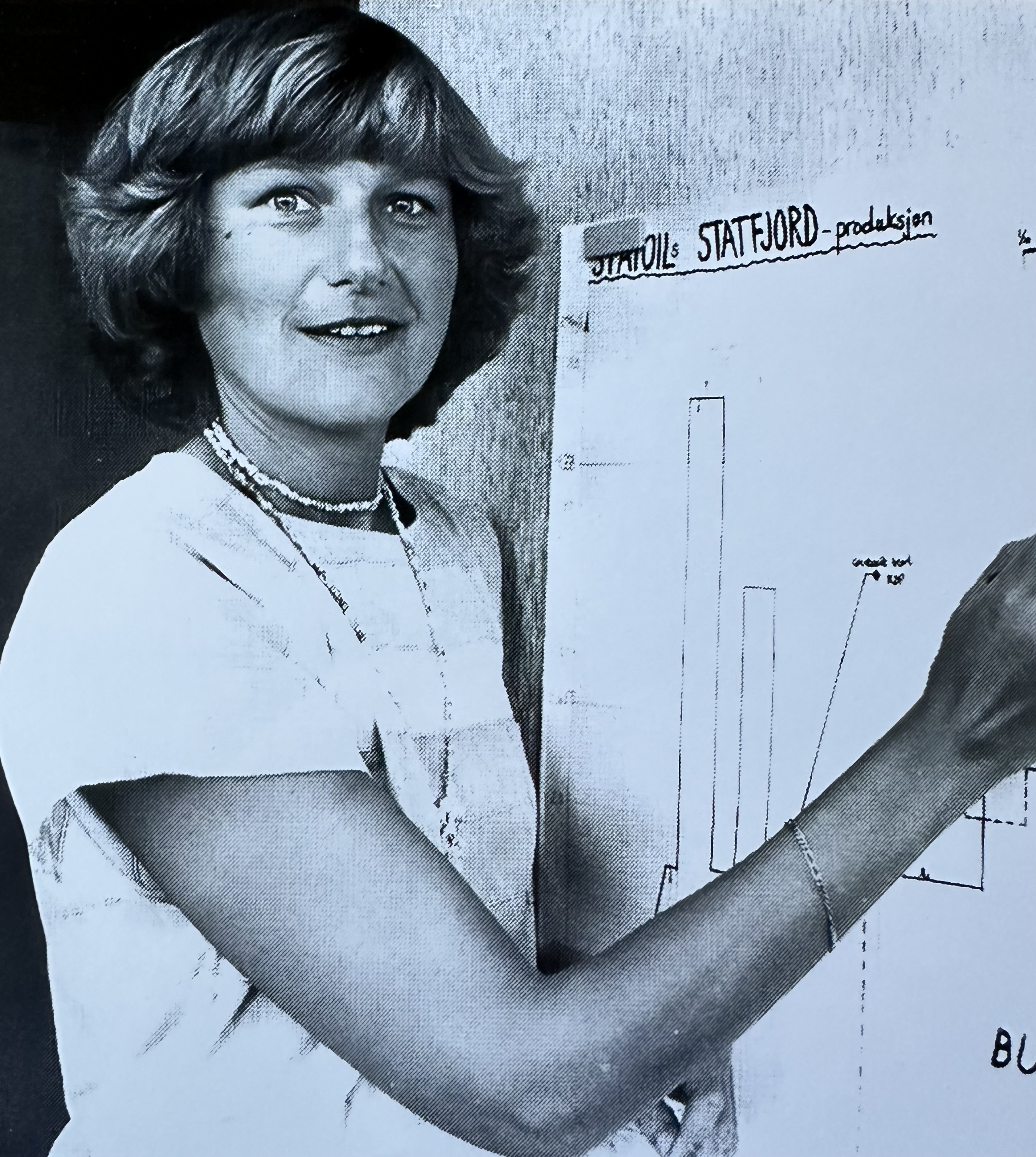
Gro Brækken at Statoil 1986

In 1994, Brækken joined the Confederation of Norwegian Enterprise (NHO) as Deputy Managing Director, where she was in charge of trade and international policies. She significantly contributed to the areas of tax, trade laws, environment, education policies, and R&D until 1999.

Brækken's leadership extended to the non-profit sector as the Secretary-General of Save the Children in Norway from 1999 to 2009, where she managed to double the revenue and facilitated a major international merger. In 2010, she became the CEO of the Norwegian Oil and Gas, a position she held until 2015.

From 2016 to 2023, Brækken served as the Managing Director/CEO of the Norsk institutt for styremedlemmer (Norwegian Institute for board members).

== Board Memberships and Other Roles ==
Throughout her career, Brækken has been an active member of various boards and committees. Notable positions include:

- Board Member, Kitron ASA (2015–present)
- Deputy Chair, Duvi Pensjon (2017–present)
- Chair, Norwegian Petroleum Museum (2015–2023)
- Chair, Norwegian Air Ambulance Foundation (2015–2022)
- Board Member, Cambi AS (2010–2023)
- Member of the Corporate Assembly and the Nomination Committee, StatoilHydro ASA (2007–2010)
- Board Member, The Vestfold Hospital (2003–2008)
- Deputy Board Member, Norfund (2000–2004)
- Chair, PTL AS (Prosjekt- og teknologiledelse AS) (1999–2009)
- Board Member and later chair, Norwegian Refugee Council (1997–1999)
- Board Member, Jansons legat (1997–present)
- Board Member, Norwegian Export Council (1995–1999)
- Deputy Chair, Statkraft SE (1991–1994)
- Board Member, Akergruppen (1989–1999)
- Board Member, Kongsberggruppen AS (1987–1997)
- Norwegian representative and later Vice President of Committee A, International Gas Union (1984–1988)

== Personal life ==
Brækken currently resides in Oslo. She is married to Ingvald Fergestad and has three children.
