= Gro Møllerstad =

Norwegian businesswoman and politician

Gro Møllerstad (born 1960) is a Norwegian headhunter, former editor and politician for the Labour Party.

She was a personal advisor (today known as political advisor) to Minister of Social Affairs Tove Strand Gerhardsen from August 1986 to September 1988, during the second cabinet Brundtland.

Møllerstad was responsible for the implementation of the Clean Air Act (Smoking Act) which was introduced on 1 July 1988.

She also worked as a journalist in the Norwegian Broadcasting Corporation and Dagbladet, before founding her own recruitment company, Nye Hoder in 2000 and Hodejegerne in 2002. Among others, she helped recruit the new CEO of the Norwegian Broadcasting Corporation in 2007. In 2004 Hodejegerne gained negative publicity when six of the eight directors they recruited to the new radio channel Kanal 24 quit within less than a year.

Møllerstad has explained the disparity between men's and women's earnings with lack of negotiation skills among most women.

She took the cand.mag. degree at the Norwegian Journalist College in 1985, and later took a Master of Management degree at the Norwegian School of Management.
