= Peter Deakin (British Army officer) =

British Army general

Major-General Peter Deakin CB CBE
- Deakin in 1960
- Born: December 1910
- Died: 8 September 1992 (aged 81); Balfron, Scotland
- Military career
- Allegiance: United Kingdom
- Branch: British Army
- Rank: Major-General
- Service number: 49812
- Unit: Grenadier Guards
- Commands: 32nd Guards Brigade; 29th Infantry Brigade; 56th (London) Armoured Division
- Conflicts: Second World War
- Awards: Companion of the Order of the Bath; Commander of the Order of the British Empire

Major-General Cecil Martin Fothergill "Peter" Deakin, CB, CBE (December 1910 – 8 September 1992) was a British Army officer.

== Military career ==
Deakin was commissioned into the Grenadier Guards on 29 January 1931. After serving the Second World War he became commander of 32nd Guards Brigade in July 1953, commander of 29th Infantry Brigade in January 1955 and Director of Military Training at the War Office in January 1959. We went on to be General Officer Commanding 56th (London) Infantry Division in March 1959 and then Director-General of the Territorial Army in August 1960 before retiring in September 1962.

He was known as "Peter".

== Family ==
In 1934 he married Evelyn Mary Frances Grant, daughter of Colonel Sir Arthur Grant of Monymusk, 10th Baronet; they had a son and a daughter.

Military offices
Preceded by Robert Bray	GOC 56th (London) Armoured Division; 1959–1960	Succeeded by Division merged with London District
