= Kavli =

Norwegian food brand

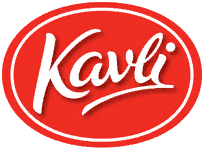
- Product type: Cheese
- Current owner: Kavli Trust
- Country: Norway
- Markets: 30 countries
- Previous owners: 1893 – Olav Kavli; 1962 – Kavlifondet
- Website: http://www.kavli.no/

Kavli (Norwegian pronunciation: [ˈkɑvlɪ]) is a Norwegian brand of soft cheese, caviar, mayonnaise, crackers and milk. The company sells products in 30 countries, with plants in Norway, Finland, Sweden, Denmark, England and Scotland.

In 1914, Olav Kavli founded Kavli Holding A/S. In 1924, Olav Kavli invented a way to produce long-lasting soft cheese and launched the Primula brand. Later the corporation introduced new related products. In 1962, the ownership of the company was transferred to the Kavli Trust which is headquartered at Nesttun outside Bergen, Norway.
