= Gordimer (crater) =

Crater on Mercury

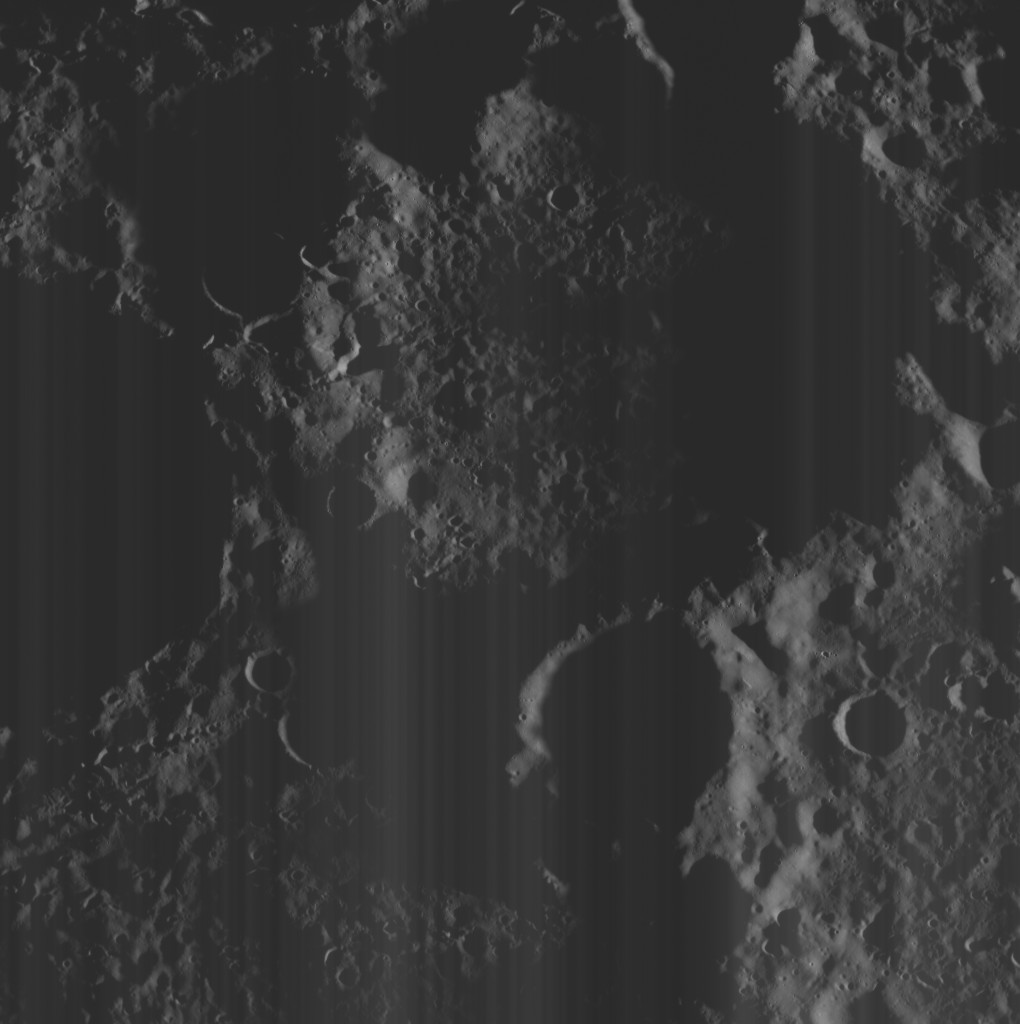
- MESSENGER WAC image, with Gordimer in upper right
- Planet: Mercury
- Coordinates: 87.73°N 170.9°W
- Quadrangle: Borealis
- Diameter: 58 km
- Eponym: Nadine Gordimer

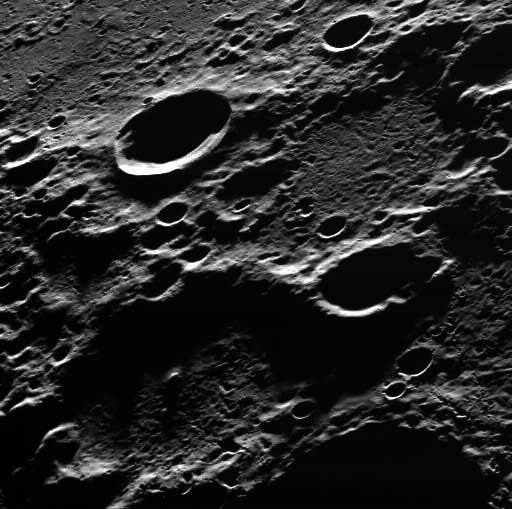
Oblique view of Burke crater (upper left) and Gordimer crater (lower left)

Gordimer is a crater on Mercury, near the north pole. Its name was adopted by the International Astronomical Union (IAU) in 2019, after the South African writer Nadine Gordimer.

The southern floor of Gordimer is in permanent shadow. S band radar data from the Arecibo Observatory collected between 1999 and 2005 indicates a radar-bright area covering the southern floor, which is probably indicative of a water ice deposit.

Tolkien crater is northwest of Gordimer, and Chesterton is to the northeast. Tryggvadóttir is due north, at the pole.
