= Biorheology (journal) =

Scientific journal

- Discipline: Physics, Biology
- Language: English
- Edited by: Herbert H. Lipowsky

Publication details
- History: 1962–present
- Publisher: IOS Press
- Frequency: Quarterly
- Impact factor: 1.875 (2020)

Standard abbreviations
- ISO 4: Biorheology

Indexing
- ISSN: 0006-355X (print); 1878-5034 (web)

Links
- Journal homepage

Biorheology is a scientific journal in the field of biorheology, the study of the deformation and flow properties (rheology) of biological fluids, published by IOS Press. It is published quarterly since 2018. It was established in 1962 by founding editors A.L. Copley and G.W. Scott Blair.

It is currently edited by Herbert H. Lipowsky (Penn State University) and Brian M. Cooke (Australian Institute of Tropical Health and Medicine).
