= Tryggvadóttir =

Tryggvadóttir is a surname. Notable people with the surname include:

- Nína Tryggvadóttir (1913–1968), Icelandic Abstract expressionist artist
- Katla Tryggvadóttir, Icelandic footballer
- Margrét Tryggvadóttir, Icelandic politician

== See also ==
- Tryggvadóttir (crater)
