= Fåhræus–Lindqvist effect =

Fluid dynamics phenomenon in blood

The Fåhræus–Lindqvist effect (/fɑːˈreɪ.əs ˈlɪndkvɪst/ far-AY-əs LIND-kvist) or sigma effect describes how the viscosity of blood changes with the diameter of the vessel it travels through. In particular there is a decrease in viscosity as the vessel diameter decreases, but only at small diameters of 10–300 micrometers (mainly capillaries). This is because erythrocytes move to the centre of the vessel, leaving only plasma near the wall of the vessel.

== History ==
The effect was first documented by a German group in 1930. Shortly after, in 1931, it was reported independently by the Swedish scientists Robin Fåhræus (1888–1968) and Johan Torsten Lindqvist (1906–2007), after whom the effect is commonly named. Fåhræus was a pathologist and hematologist, Lindqvist was a physician. Fåhræus and Lindqvist published their article in the American Journal of Physiology in 1931 describing the effect. Their study represented an important advance in the understanding of hemodynamics which had widespread implications for the study of human physiology. They forced blood through fine glass capillary tubes connecting two reservoirs. Capillary diameters were less than 250 μm, and experiments were conducted at sufficiently high shear rates (≥100 1/s) so that a similar flow in a large tube would be effectively Newtonian. After correcting for entrance effects, they presented their data in terms of an effective viscosity, derived from fitting measured pressure drop and volume flow rate to Hagen–Poiseuille equation for a tube of radius R

$$\ Q = \frac{ \pi R^4 \Delta P}{ 8 \mu_{e} L }$$

where:

$Q$ is the volumetric flow rate
$\Delta P$ is the pressure drop across the capillary
$L$ is the length of capillary
$\mu_{e}$ is the effective viscosity
$R$ is the radius
$\pi$ is the mathematical constant

Although the Hagen–Poiseuille equation is only valid for a Newtonian fluid, fitting experimental data to this equation provides a convenient method of characterizing flow resistance by a single number, namely $\mu_{e}$. In general, $\mu_{e}$ will depend on the fluid being tested, the capillary diameter, and the flow rate (or pressure drop). However, for a given fluid and a fixed pressure drop, data can be compared between capillaries of differing diameter. Fahræus and Lindqvist noticed two unusual features of their data. First, $\mu_{e}$ decreased with decreasing capillary radius, R. This decrease was most pronounced for capillary diameters < 0.5mm. Second, the tube hematocrit (i.e., the average hematocrit in the capillary) was always less than the hematocrit in the feed reservoir. The ratio of these two hematocrits, the tube relative hematocrit, $H_{R}$, is defined as

$$\mathrm{H_{R}} = { \mbox{tube hematocrit} \over \mbox{feed reservoir hematocrit}}$$

== Explanation of phenomena ==
The Fåhræus–Lindqvist effect is caused by a cell-free layer of plasma. This thin layer adjacent to the capillary wall has no red blood cells, so its effective viscosity is lower than that of whole blood. The cell-free layer therefore reduces flow resistance within the capillary, making the effective viscosity in the capillary less than the viscosity of whole blood. Because the cell-free layer is very thin (approximately 3 μm) this effect is insignificant in capillaries whose diameter is large.

This explanation, while accurate, is ultimately unsatisfying, since it fails to answer the fundamental question of why a plasma cell-free layer exists. There are two factors which promote cell-free layer formation.

1. For particles flowing in a tube, there is a net hydrodynamic force that tends to force the particles towards the center of the capillary. This has been cited as the Segrè–Silberberg effect, although the named effect pertains to dilute suspensions, and may not operate in the case of concentrated mixtures. There are also effects associated with deformability of red blood cells that might increase this force.
2. It is clear that red blood cells cannot pass through the capillary wall, which implies that the centers of red blood cells must lie at least one red blood cell half-thickness away from the wall. This means that, on average, there will be more red blood cells near the center of the capillary than very near the wall.

Cell-free marginal layer model is a mathematical model which tries to explain Fåhræus–Lindqvist effect mathematically.

== See also ==
- Cell-free marginal layer model
- Fåhræus effect
- Hemorheology
- hemodynamics
