= Haemoconia =

Small lipid particles

Haemoconia (or Hemoconia) are small particles of lipids formed by fragmentation of the stroma of erythrocytes (red-blood cells). They are ingested by phagocytes within the blood. Haemoconia were first discovered in 1896 by HF Müller. They are minute bits of disintegrated red blood corpuscles.

Also in resting and slow flowing blood the RBC form piles called Roulaux by sticking together by the force of surface tension.
