= Robin Fåhræus =

Swedish pathologist and hematologist (1888–1968)

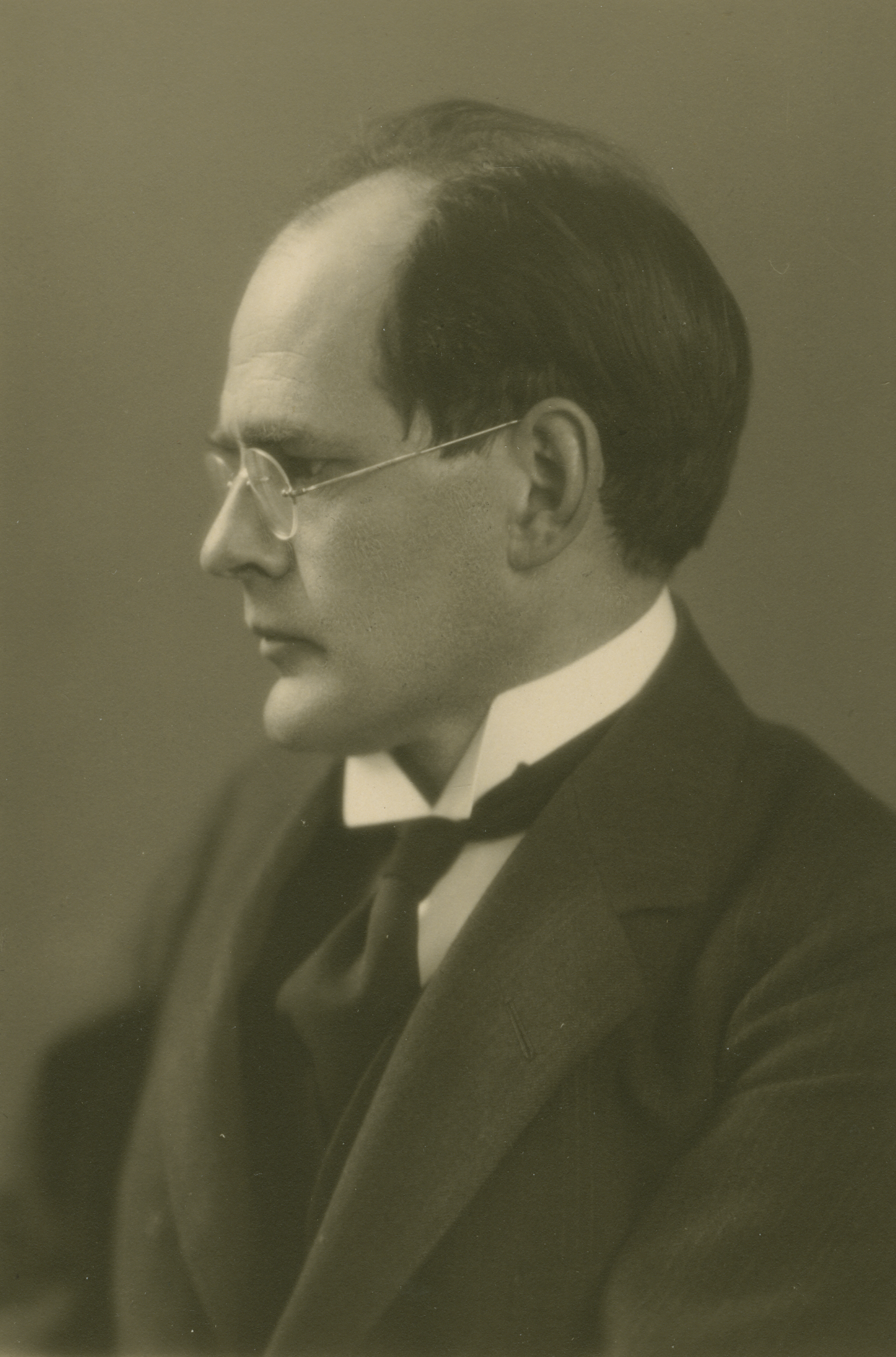
Robin Fåhræus, photo by Lars Emil Finn

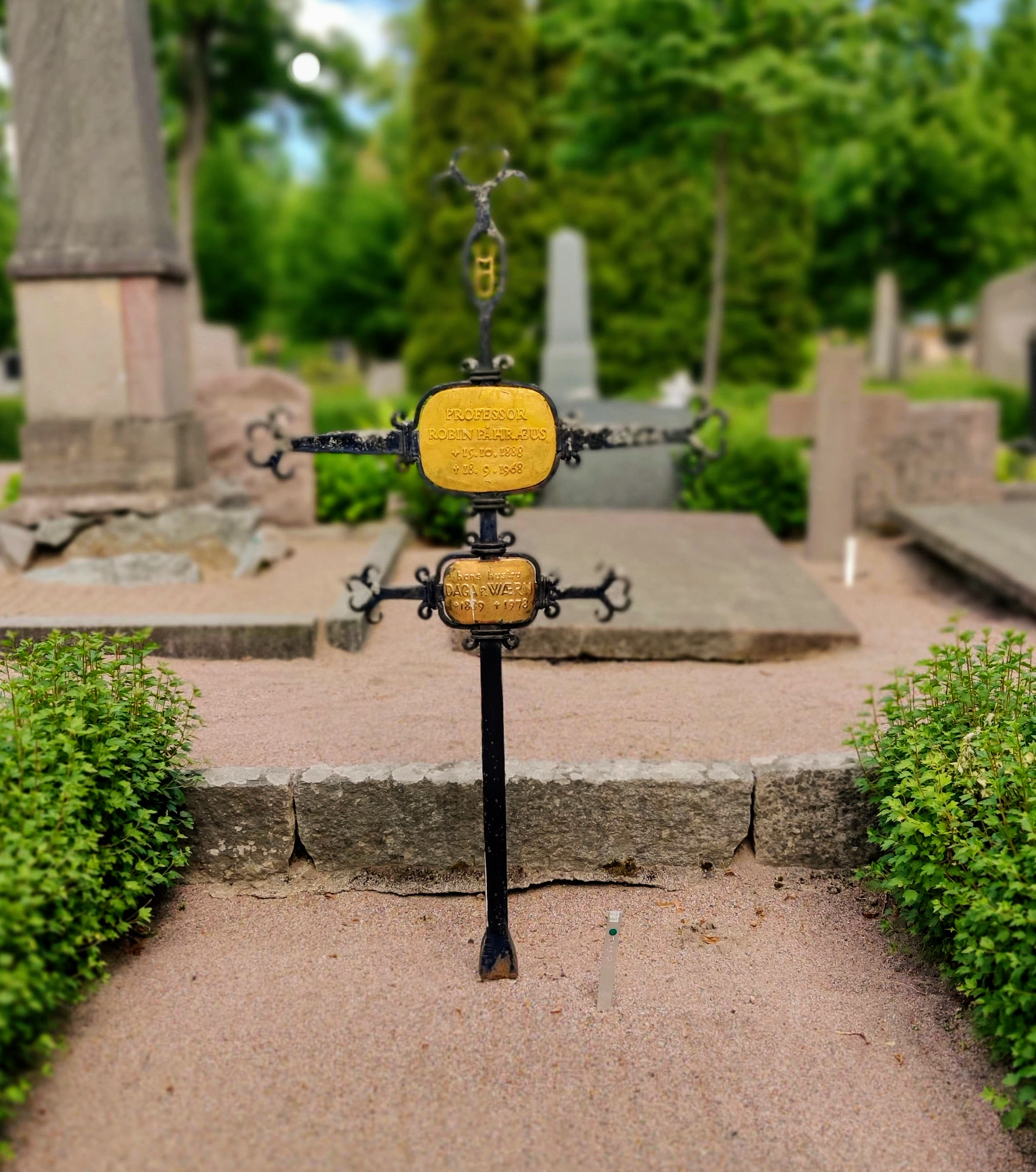
Robin Fåhræus' grave at Uppsala old cemetery

Robert "Robin" Sanno Fåhræus (/fɑːˈreɪ.əs/ far-AY-əs; 15 October 1888 – 18 September 1968) was a Swedish medical researcher noted for his contributions to hemorheology.

== Biography ==
Fåhræus was the son of art historian Klas Fåhraeus and actress Olga Björkegren. He commenced studies at Karolinska Institute in 1908, where he received his medical license in 1922. Before that, in 1921, he had completed his research doctorate with the title The suspension-stability of the blood. He became associate professor of experimental pathology at the Karolinska Institute in 1922. He was professor of pathology at Uppsala University from 1928 to 1947, and professor of general pathology and pathological anatomy in Uppsala from 1947 to 1955, after his previous chair had been split in two.

Fåhræus became a member of the Royal Swedish Academy of Sciences in 1935. In 1966, the International Society of Hemorheology awarded him their first Poiseuille medal, the Society's highest award.

== Research ==
While studying at the Karolinska Institute he conducted research on eclampsia and observed that blood samples from pregnant women easily could be distinguished from other blood samples because the red blood cells descended more quickly in the test tubes, leaving a thick layer of blood plasma on top. This phenomenon is the erythrocyte sedimentation rate, which can be used as a diagnostic tool.

After Fåhræus had received his position at the Karolinska Institute in 1922, he sought contact with professor Theodor Svedberg in Uppsala and suggested that the recently built ultracentrifuge should be used to determine the molecular mass of hemoglobin. Svedberg and Fåhræus published the result in 1926, the same year Svedberg received the Nobel Prize in Chemistry.

In Uppsala from 1928, Fåhræus started to study the flow of blood in thin blood vessels, which led to the discovery of two effects named after him. In 1929 he described the Fåhræus effect, a decrease in the average concentration of red blood cells when blood flows in a tube of smaller diameter. In 1931 he and co-worker Torsten Lindqvist described the Fåhræus–Lindqvist effect, the change of the viscosity of blood with the diameter of the tube it travels through.
