= Erythrocyte aggregation =

Reversible clumping of RBCs

Erythrocyte aggregation is the reversible clumping of red blood cells (RBCs) under low shear forces or at stasis.

Stacked red blood cells flow across drying slide

Erythrocytes aggregate in a special way, forming rouleaux. Rouleaux are stacks of erythrocytes which form because of the unique discoid shape of the cells in vertebrate body. The flat surface of the discoid RBCs give them a large surface area to make contact and stick to each other; thus, forming a rouleau. Rouleaux formation takes place only in suspensions of RBC containing high-molecular, fibrilar proteins or polymers in the suspending medium (often Dextran-2000 in-vitro). The most important protein causing rouleaux formation in plasma is fibrinogen. RBC suspended in simple salt solutions do not form rouleaux.

== Mechanism ==
Erythrocyte aggregation is a physiological phenomenon that takes places in normal blood under low-flow conditions or at stasis. The presence or increased concentrations of acute phase proteins, particularly fibrinogen, results in enhanced erythrocyte aggregation.

Current experimental and theoretical evidence supports the mechanism related to the depletion of high-molecular weight molecules (e.g., fibrinogen) for rouleaux formation. This mechanism is also known as “chemiosmotic hypothesis” for aggregation. Erythrocyte aggregation is determined by both suspending phase (blood plasma) and cellular properties. Surface properties of erythrocytes, such as surface charge density strongly influence the extent and time course of aggregation.

== Effects ==
Erythrocyte aggregation is the main determinant of blood viscosity at low shear rate. Rouleaux formation also determines Erythrocyte sedimentation rate which is a non-specific indicator of the presence of disease.

Influence of erythrocyte aggregation on in vivo blood flow is still a controversial issue. Enhanced aggregation affects venous hemodynamics. Erythrocyte aggregation also affects hemodynamic mechanisms in microcirculation and vascular control mechanisms.

== Causes ==
Conditions which cause increased rouleaux formation include infections, inflammatory and connective tissue disorders, and cancers (most common in multiple myeloma). It also occurs in diabetes mellitus and is one of the causative factors for microvascular occlusion in diabetic retinopathy.

Erythrocyte sedimentation rate closely reflects the extent of aggregation, therefore can be used as a measure of aggregation. Erythrocyte aggregation can also be quantitated by monitoring optical properties of blood during the time course of aggregation process.

== Measurement ==
blood film

syllectometry

intravital microscopy

high-frequency ultrasound

Optical coherence tomography
