= Olga Björkegren =

Swedish opera singer (1857–1950)

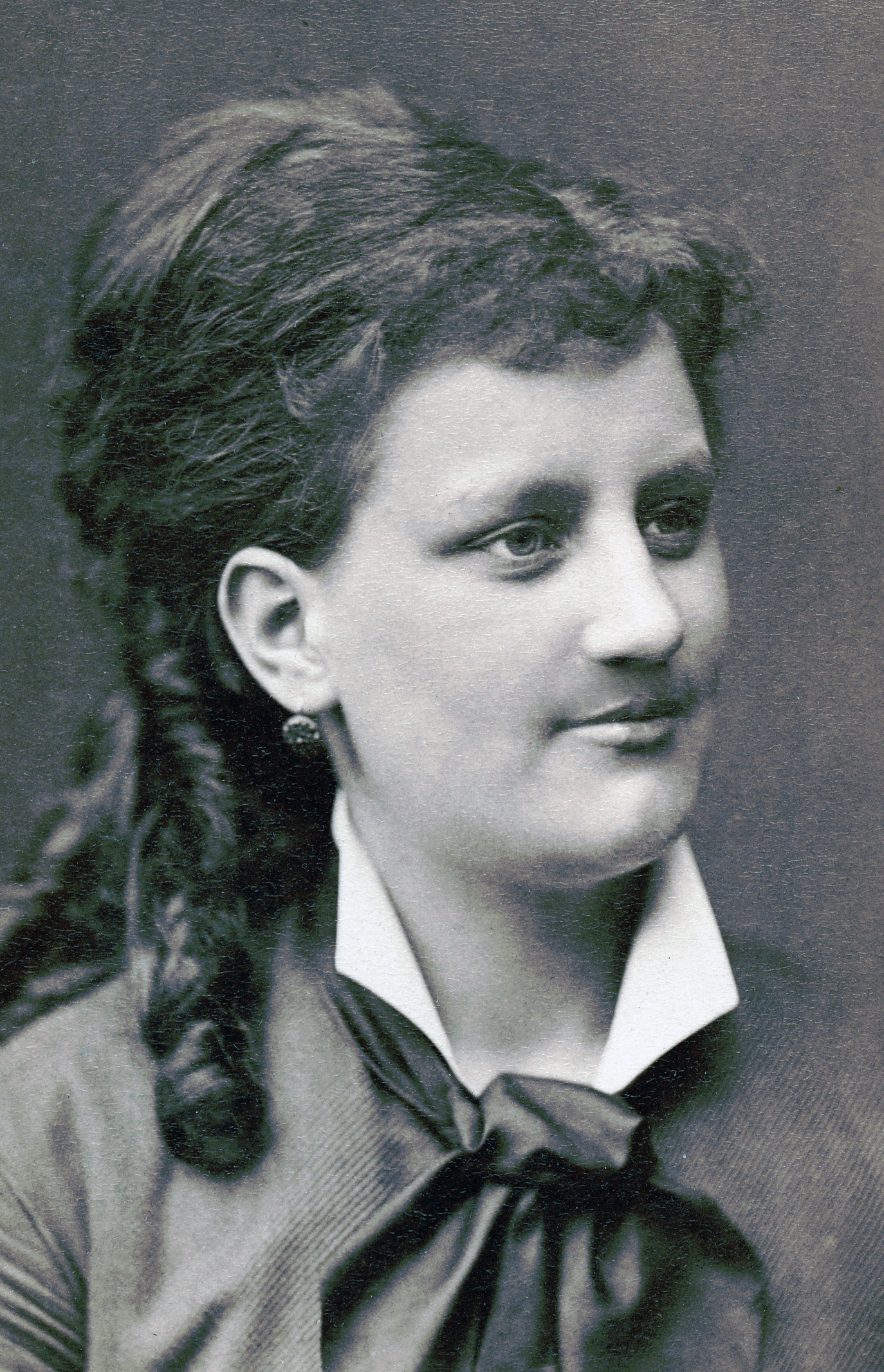
Olga Björkegren

Olga Augusta Christina Björkegren (8 September 1857 – 30 April 1950) was a Swedish opera singer.

Daughter of the Sommelier Per Björkegren and Anna Söderberg. She was a student at the Royal Dramatic Training Academy in 1873, and active at Swedish Theatre (Stockholm) in 1875–79 and the Royal Swedish Opera in 1879–87. She was described as dignified and classic and well suited for parts of great dignity.

She married the art collector and writer Klas Fåhraeus in 1887. One of their children, Robin Fåhræus, became a noted medical researcher. In 1909, the couple used their villa as a combined art gallery, and their home became a center of artists: many young artists were also allowed to live there free of costs to develop their talent.
