= British Society of Rheology =

- Formation: 1950 (1940)
- Type: Professional association
- Location: United Kingdom
- Members: 600
- Official language: English
- President: Prof Simon Cox
- Key people: Dr Claire McIlroy (Secretary)
- Website: www.bsr.org.uk

A British society for those interested in all aspects of rheology.

Formed in 1940 by G. W. Scott Blair (Secretary), V. G. W. Harrison, and H. R. Lang as the British Rheologists' Club and changed to its present name in 1950. The inaugural meeting was on 16 November 1940 at the University of Reading, at which Sir Geoffrey Taylor was elected President, and its first major conference was at St Hilda's College, Oxford in 1944. A news journal, The Bulletin of the British Rheologists' Club began in 1941. This included some abstracts of papers, which in 1958 became a separate publication Rheology Abstracts which ceased as a printed publication in 2013.

Scott Blair went on to become the first President of the renamed society in 1950.

It awards a Gold Medal for outstanding contributions to the field as well as other awards and scholarships. It was a founder member of the International Society of Rheology and the European Society of Rheology.

Publishes:

- Rheology Reviews: peer-refereed academic journal
- Rheology Bulletin: news of interest to members
