= Agglutinin =

Substance in blood that can promote coagulation and clumping of particles

An agglutinin is a substance in the blood that causes particles to coagulate and aggregate; that is, to change from fluid-like state to a thickened-mass (solid) state.

Agglutinins can be antibodies that cause antigens to aggregate by binding to the antigen-binding sites of antibodies. Agglutinins can also be any substance other than antibodies, such as sugar-binding protein lectins.

When an agglutinin is added to a uniform suspension of particles, such as bacteria or blood, in a test tube (in vitro), agglutinin binds to the agglutinin-specific structure on the particle causing the particles to aggregate and fall to the bottom, leaving a clear suspension. This phenomenon known as agglutination is of great importance in medicine, as it serves as a diagnostic tool.

== Medical relevance ==
Reaction of particles with agglutinin is used to indicate present or past host contact with a pathogen. A host infected with a pathogen produces antibodies to neutralize the pathogen. As a result, the blood of a host applied to a diagnostic kit causes the aggregation of the pathogenic particles due to the antigen-agglutinin interaction. Conversely, agglutination can also be used to identify new bacteria or cells with a specific antigen by exposing them to serum containing known agglutinins.

Agglutination, using blood agglutinins known as hemagglutinins, is used diagnostically to identify blood types of human beings based on the reaction between the erythrocyte (red blood cell) antigens and agglutinins. Human erythrocytes have two main types of antigens (Antigen A and B) expressed in different combinations to give either erythrocytes that express only antigen A, antigen B, antigen A and B together or no antigen at all. When erythrocytes are exposed to hemagglutinins (anti-A and Anti-B antibodies), those expressing antigen A or B coagulate upon contacting anti-A and anti-B hemagglutinins respectively. Erythrocytes expressing both antigens coagulate upon contacting either anti-A or anti-B hemagglutinins while those not expressing any antigen do not coagulate upon contact with any hemagglutinin. This technique serves as a quick and effective method for identifying the blood type of a person and it is essential when blood transfusion has to be performed quickly to replenish lost blood.

== Diseases ==
Agglutinin might also be associated with diseases of which the most common is an autoimmune disease known as cold agglutinin disease. In cold agglutinin disease, the body produces agglutinins or antibodies that coagulate erythrocytes and lyse them at room temperature or lower. Under normal circumstances, the lifespan of erythrocytes is 120 days after which they are degraded by the spleen. In individuals that have cold agglutinin disease, the lifespan of erythrocytes is shortened. The rate of erythrocyte production by the bone marrow is lower than the rate of destruction, thus, individuals with cold agglutinin disease develop a form of anemia. A body might produce agglutinins to attack the erythrocytes due to allergies to foods, inhalants, chemicals and infections. A person suffering from this condition will likely have cooler body parts such as fingers, nose, and ears attacked more often than warmer areas such as armpits.

== See also ==
- Rouleaux
