= Burke (crater) =

Crater on Mercury

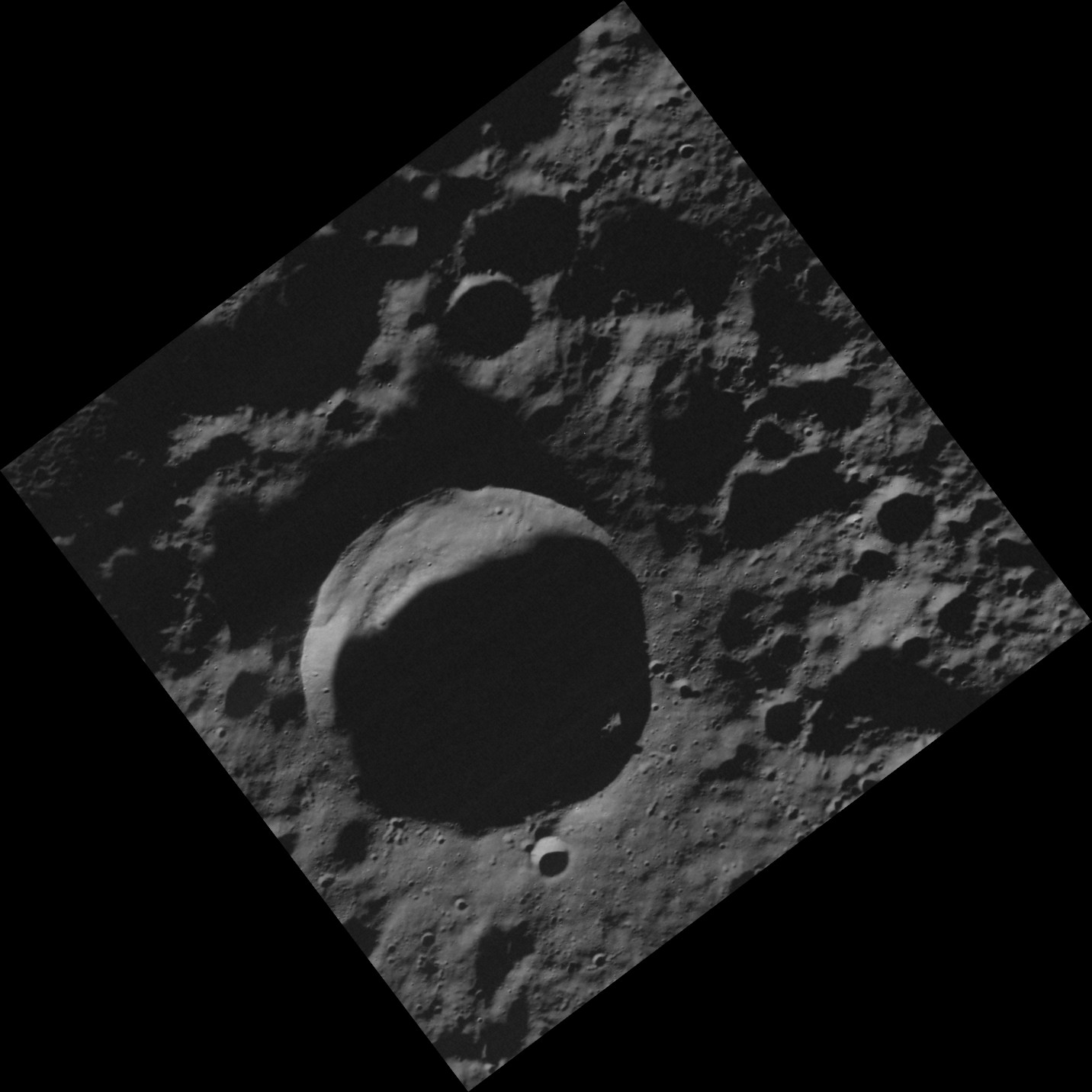
- MESSENGER WAC image of Burke
- Feature type: Impact crater
- Location: Borealis quadrangle, Mercury
- Coordinates: 85.91°N 171.56°W
- Diameter: 28.5 km (17.7 mi)
- Eponym: Billie Burke

Burke is a crater on Mercury. Its name was adopted by the International Astronomical Union (IAU) on November 4, 2015. Burke is named for the American actress Billie Burke.

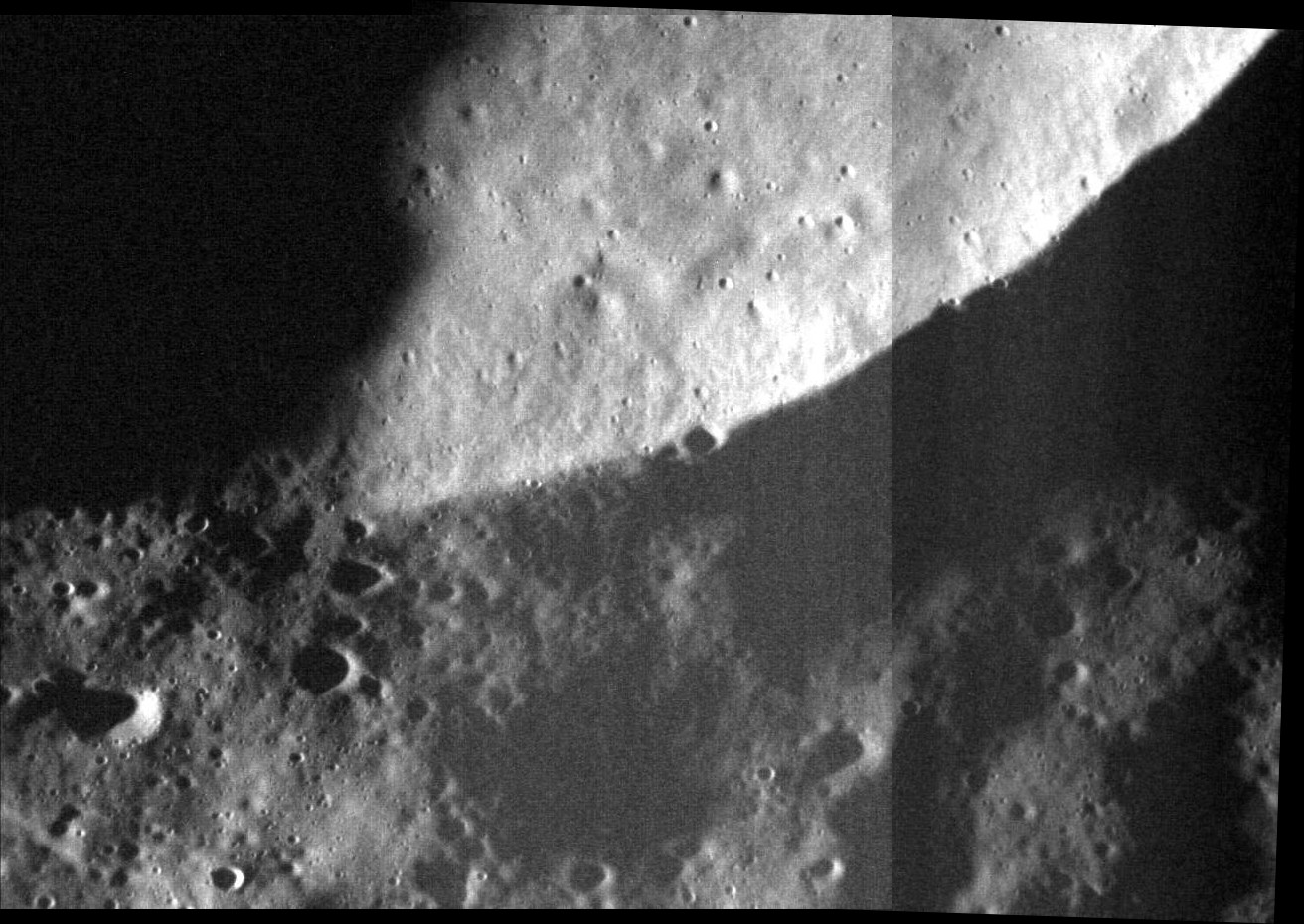
Northeast rim of Burke crater

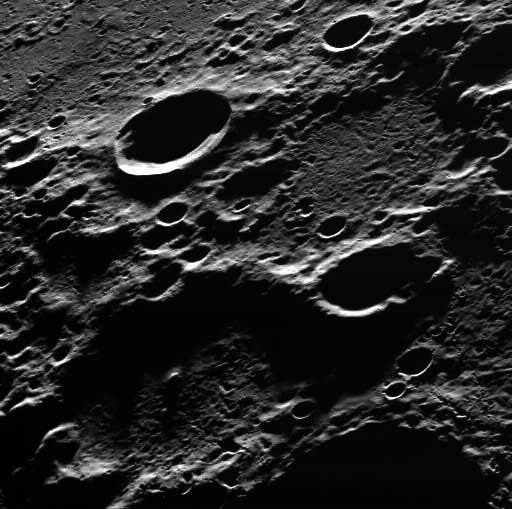
Oblique view of Burke crater (upper left) and Gordimer crater (lower left)
