= G. W. Scott Blair =

British chemist

George William Scott Blair
- Born: 23 July 1902; Weybridge, England
- Died: 30 September 1987 (aged 85); Iffley, Oxfordshire, England
- Education: Trinity College, Oxford
- Known for: Contributions to rheology

George William Scott Blair (23 July 1902 – 30 September 1987) was a British chemist noted for his contributions to rheology. In fact he has been called "the first rheologist"

== Life ==
Scott Blair was born 23 July 1902, in Weybridge and went to Winchester College. He studied chemistry at Trinity College, Oxford receiving a BA in 1923.

He began work as a colloid chemist, studying flour suspensions which led to a series of papers on baker's dough. In 1926 he joined the Rothamsted Experimental Station, where the focus was on soil science. In 1928 he married Rita, a child psychologist, who survived him.

In December 1929 Scott Blair attended (and chaired) the founding meeting of the Society of Rheology in Washington, D.C. Chemist Eugene C. Bingham led the new society concerned with the problems of flow. Scott Blair held a Rockefeller Fellowship at the time. In 1931 Markus Reiner visited Scott Blair in England beginning a long friendship.

In 1936 he submitted his PhD thesis to the University of London.

In 1940, along with Vernon Harrison, he founded the British Rheologists' Club, later to become the British Society of Rheology.

In 1937 he became Head of the Chemistry Department (and later headed the Physics Department as well) at the National Institute for Research in Dairying, at Shinfield near Reading until his retirement in 1967. He died on 30 September 1987, at Iffley, Oxfordshire.

== Work ==
His contribution to food science was celebrated in a special edition of the Journal of Texture Studies He also initiated what he called psycho-rheology: the effect of food texture on the consumer. However he promoted and was a major contributor to the study of the rheological effects in blood flow to the genitalia, as well as biological systems in general. The journal Biorheology, which he co-founded, published an obituary. His contribution to medical science was recognised in his obituary in the journal Thrombosis Research.

== Some publications ==
- G. W. Scott Blair (1938) An Introduction to Industrial Rheology (Churchill, London)
- G. W. Scott Blair (1949) A Survey of General and Applied Rheology (Pitman, London)
- G. W. Scott Blair (1950) Measurements of Mind and Matter (Dobson, London)
- G. W. Scott Blair (1953) Foodstuffs : their plasticity, fluidity and consistency (Amsterdam)
- G. W. Scott Blair & M. Reiner (1957) Agricultural Rheology (Routledge & Kegan Paul, London)
- G. W. Scott Blair (1969) Elementary Rheology (Academic Press, London)
- G. W. Scott Blair (1974) An Introduction to Biorheology (Elsevier, Oxford)
