= Tryggvadóttir (crater) =

Crater on Mercury

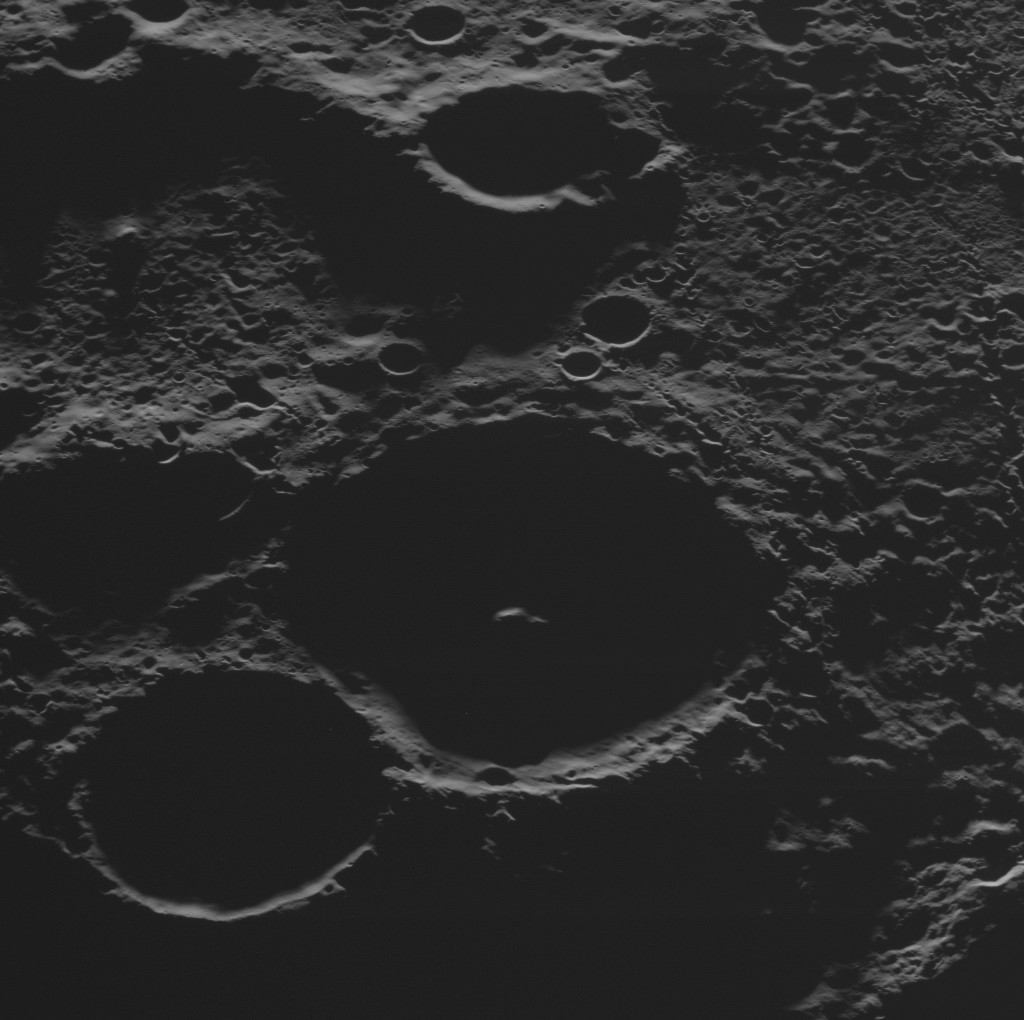
- MESSENGER image, with Tryggvadóttir in lower left and Tolkien at center
- Planet: Mercury
- Coordinates: 89.55°N 171.56°W
- Quadrangle: Borealis
- Diameter: 31 km
- Eponym: Nína Tryggvadóttir

Tryggvadóttir is a crater on Mercury. The north pole of Mercury is located next to its northern rim. It was named by the IAU in 2012 after the Icelandic artist Nína Tryggvadóttir.

All but the rim of the crater is in permanent shadow. S band radar data from the Arecibo Observatory collected between 1999 and 2005 indicates a radar-bright area covering the entire floor of Tryggvadóttir, which is probably indicative of a water ice deposit.

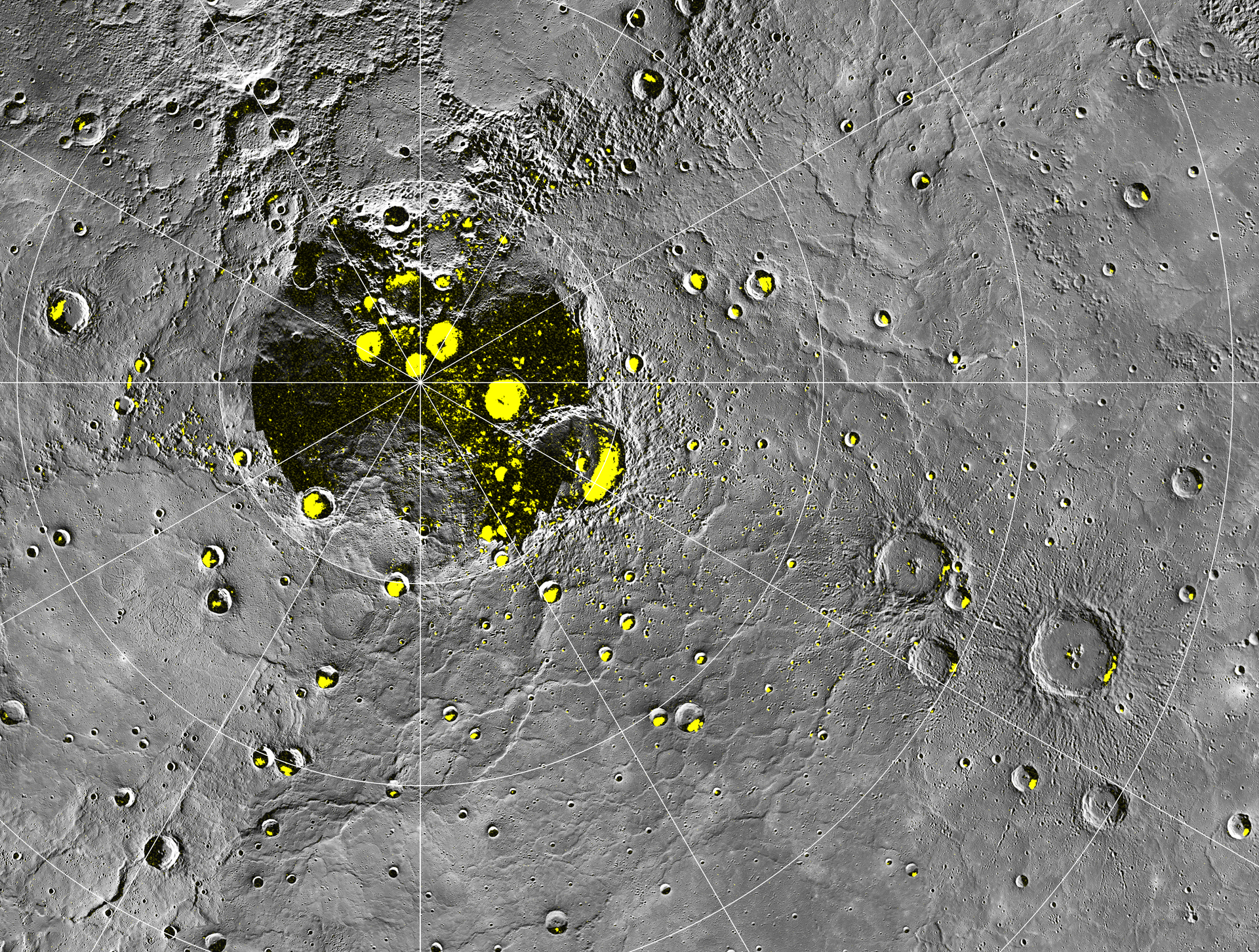
Radar-bright deposits near the north pole. Tryggvadóttir is above left of center.

Tryggvadóttir is adjacent to the larger Tolkien crater and to Chesterton crater.
