= Tolkien (crater) =

Crater on Mercury

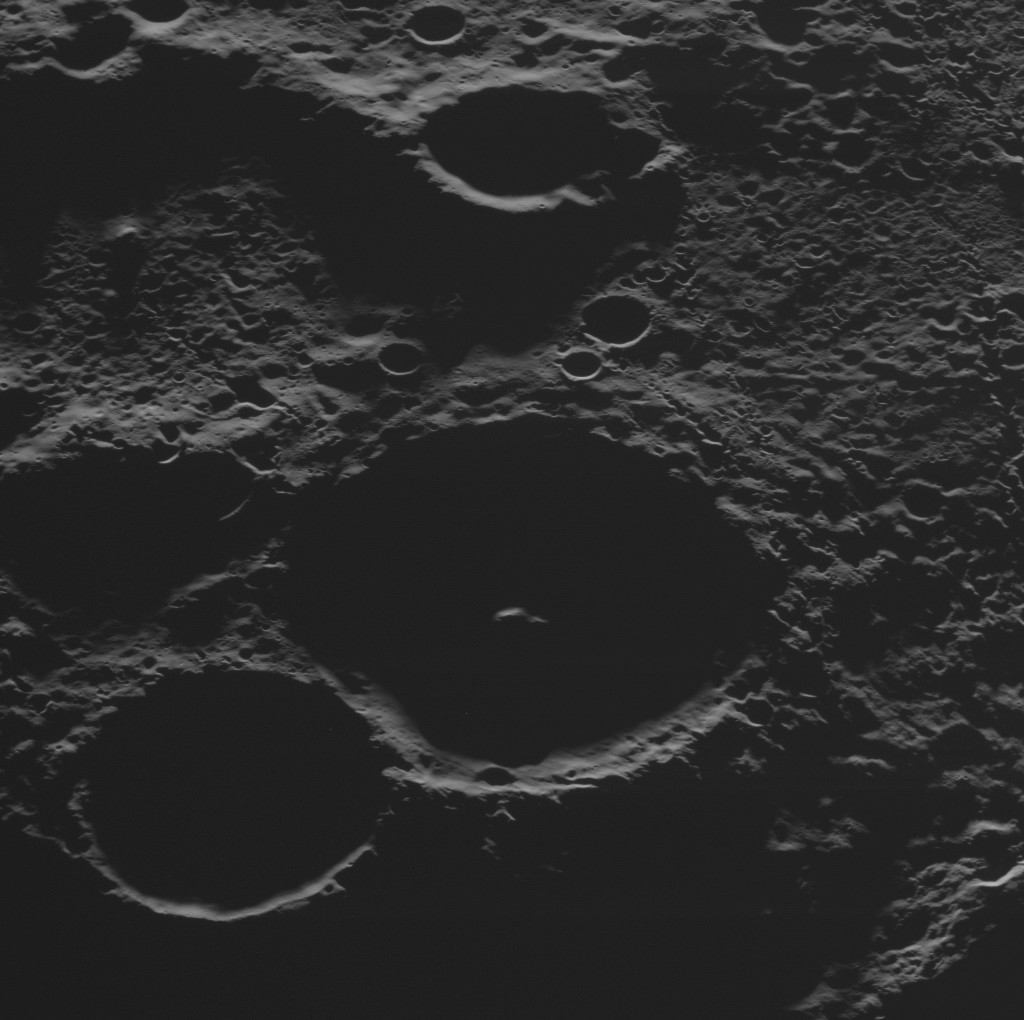
- MESSENGER image with Tolkien at center. The north pole is on the rim of Tryggvadóttir, the crater at left foreground.
- Planet: Mercury
- Coordinates: 88.82°N 211.08°W
- Quadrangle: Borealis
- Diameter: 50 km
- Eponym: J. R. R. Tolkien

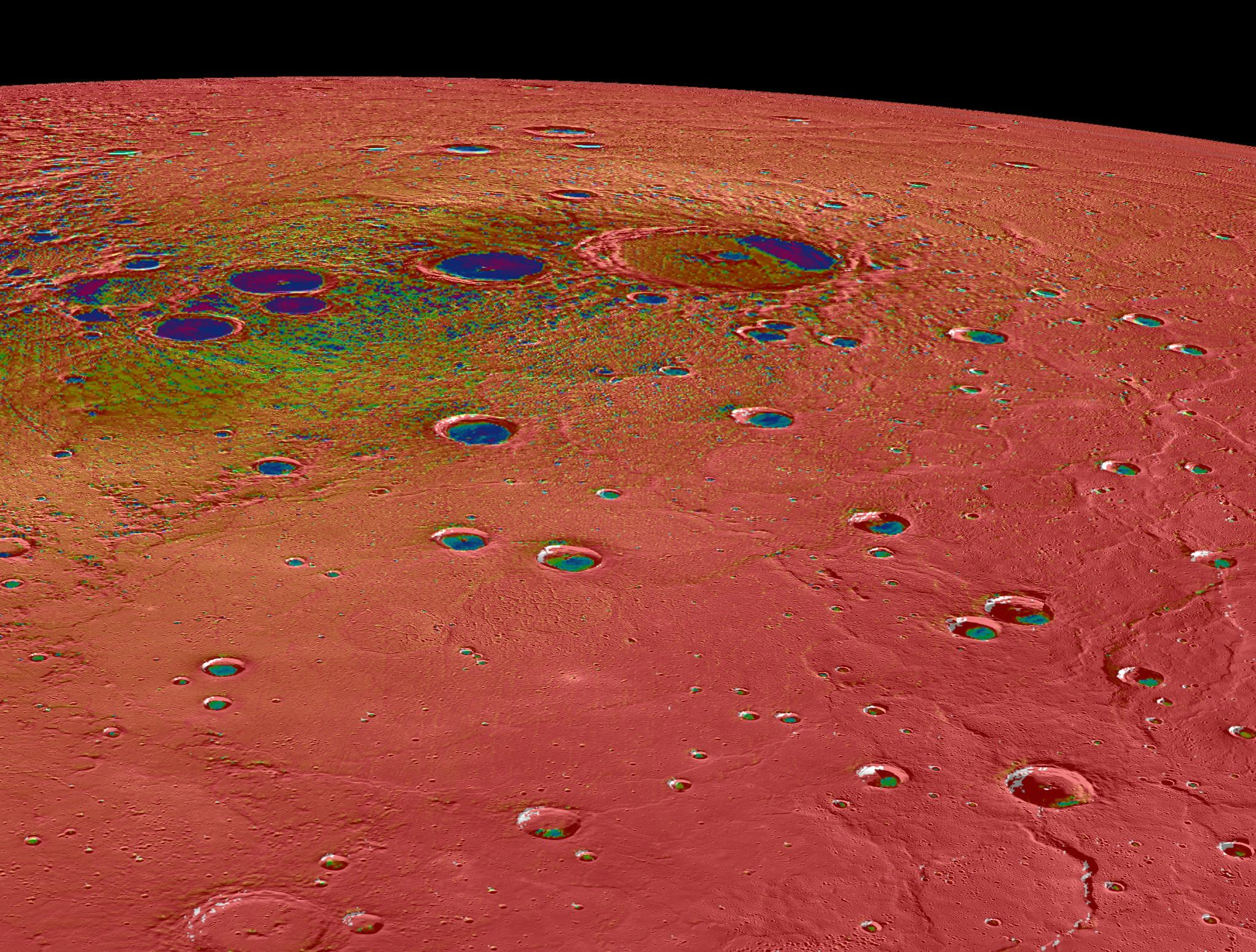
Processed image of the northernmost part of planet Mercury: this shows the temperatures at the North Polar Region, which ranges from >400 K (red) to 50 K (purple). Tolkien is on the left of the image.

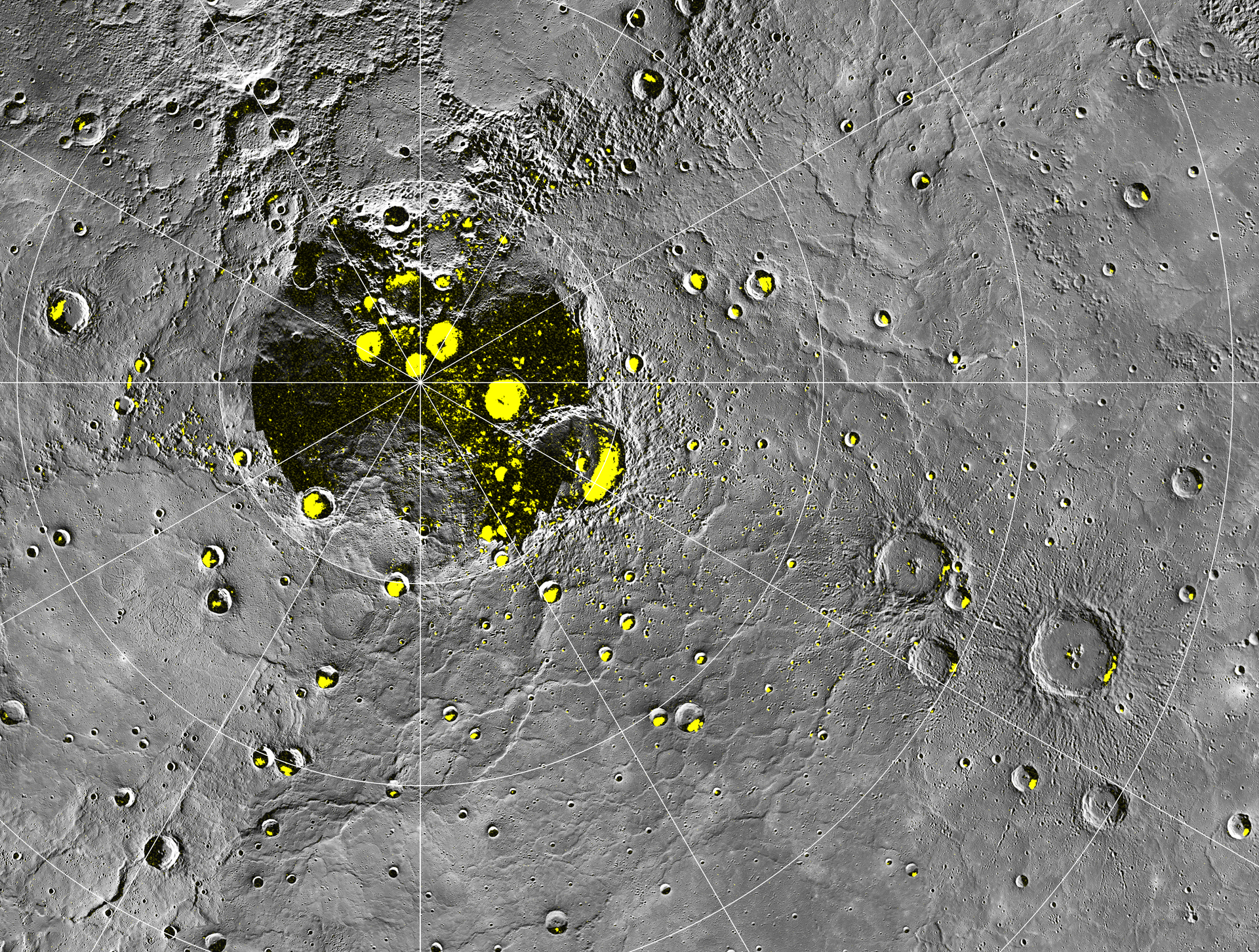
Radar-bright deposits near the north pole. Tolkien is above left of center.

Tolkien is one of the northernmost craters on Mercury, located in the Borealis quadrangle (north pole region) at 88.82 N, 211.08 W. It is 50 km in diameter. It was named after the South African born British writer J. R. R. Tolkien. The name was approved by IAU's Working Group for Planetary System Nomenclature on August 6, 2012. Since Tolkien is very close to the north pole, and Mercury has almost no axial tilt, Tolkien receives very little sunlight. S band radar data from the Arecibo Observatory collected between 1999 and 2005 indicates a radar-bright area covers the entire floor of Tolkien, which is probably indicative of a water ice deposit.

== See also ==
- List of craters on Mercury
