= Segrè–Silberberg effect =

Phenomenon in fluid dynamics

The Segrè–Silberberg effect is a fluid dynamic separation effect where a dilute suspension of neutrally buoyant particles flowing (in laminar flow) in a tube equilibrates at a distance of 0.6R from the tube's centre. This effect was first observed by Gino Segrè and Alexander Silberberg in 1961. The solid particles are subjected to both viscous drag forces and inertial lift forces. The drag forces are responsible for driving particles along the flow streamlines, whereas the inertial forces are responsible for the lateral migration of particles across the flow streamlines. The parabolic nature of the laminar velocity profile in Poiseuille flow produces a shear-induced inertial lift force that drives particles towards the channel walls. As particles migrate closer to the channel walls, the flow around the particle induces a pressure increase between the particle and the wall which prevents particles of moving closer. The opposing lift forces are dependent on the particle diameter to channel diameter ratio ($d/D$), and dominate for $d/D \geq 0.07$.
