= Biorheology =

Study of flow properties of biological fluids

Biorheology is the study of flow properties (rheology) of biological fluids. The term was first proposed by Alfred L. Copley, a German-American medical scientist, at the first International Congress on Rheology in 1948.

== Objectives and study domains ==
Biorheological research aims to determine and characterize the dynamics of physiological processes at all levels of biological organization, and the inter-relationships between rheological properties of various biological systems. Biorheological studies can include both animal and plant systems, and can be in broad contexts like the rheology of macromolecules and macromolecular arrays, or in narrower contexts like the rheology in cells, tissues or organs.

== Practical use ==
The biorheological approach applies in particular to molecular studies where changes of physical properties and conformation are investigated without reference to how the process actually takes place. Biorheological analyses include study of pathological processes through clinical research in the related fields of hemodynamics and hemorheology, and may have clinical implications in aiding the treatment of specific diseases.

== See also ==
- Alfred L. Copley, a German-American medical scientist who first proposed the term "biorheology".
- Hemorheology, the study of flow properties of blood and its elements.
- Biorheology (journal), a scientific journal in the field of biorheology
