= Chesterton (crater) =

Crater on Mercury

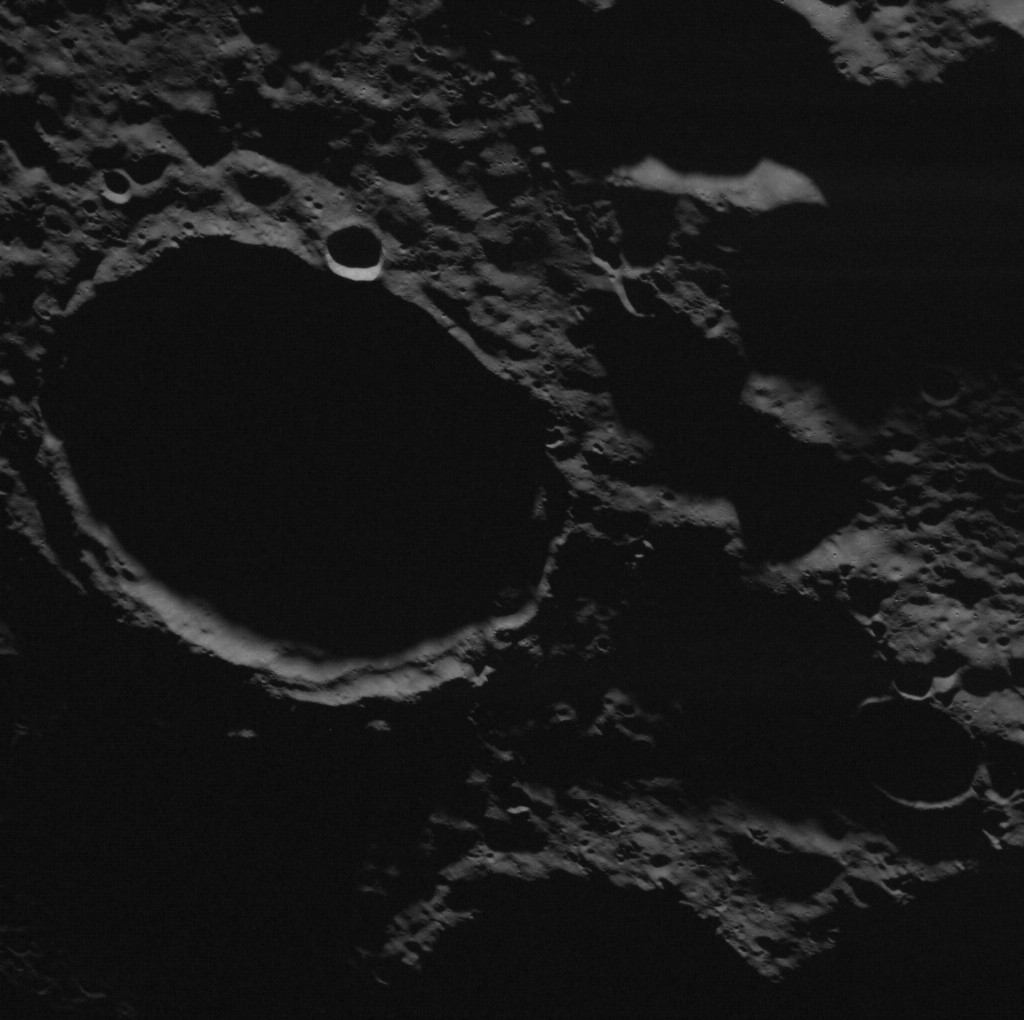
- MESSENGER image with Chesterton at left
- Feature type: Impact crater
- Location: Borealis quadrangle, Mercury
- Coordinates: 88.51°N 126.9°W
- Diameter: 37.23 km
- Eponym: Gilbert Keith Chesterton

Chesterton is a crater on Mercury, near the north pole. Its name was adopted by the International Astronomical Union in 2012, after the English author G. K. Chesterton.

The floor of the crater is in permanent shadow. S band radar data from the Arecibo Observatory collected between 1999 and 2005 indicates a radar-bright area covering the entire floor of Chesterton, which is probably indicative of a water ice deposit.

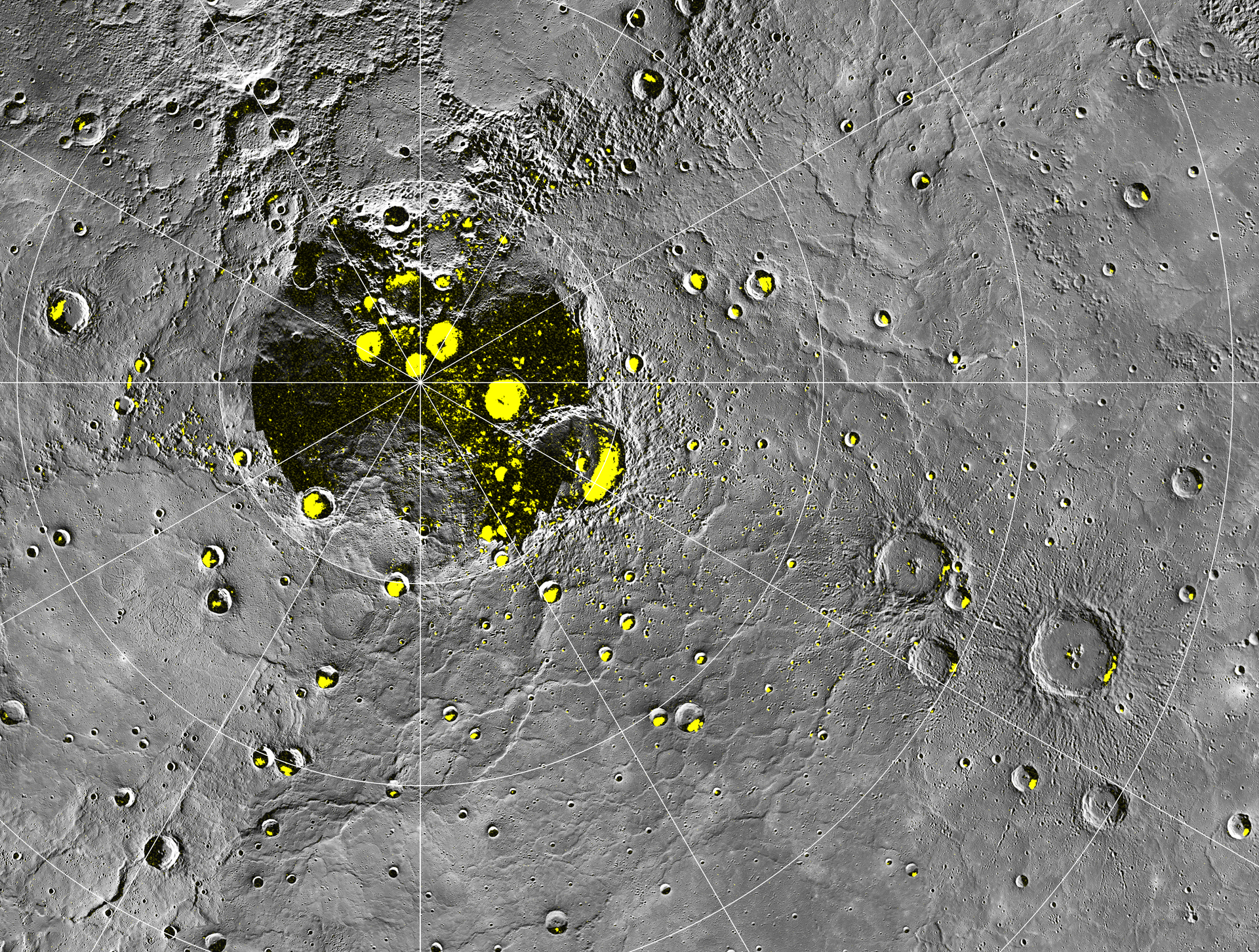
Radar-bright deposits near the north pole. Chesterton is above left of center.

Chesterton is adjacent to Tryggvadóttir crater.
