= Nína Tryggvadóttir =

Icelandic Abstract expressionist artist (1913–1968)

- Born: Jónína Tryggvadóttir; March 16, 1913; Seyðisfjörður, Danish Iceland
- Died: June 18, 1968 (aged 55); New York City, United States
- Education: Royal Danish Academy of Fine Arts (1939)
- Movement: Abstract expressionism
- Spouse: Alfred L. Copley

Nína Tryggvadóttir (born Jónína Tryggvadóttir; March 16, 1913 – June 18, 1968) was an Icelandic artist. She was one of Iceland's most important abstract expressionist artists and one of very few Icelandic female artists of her generation.

== Early life ==
Nína Tryggvadóttir was born on March 16, 1913, in Seyðisfjörður. In 1920 the family moved to Reykjavík. She studied art from Ásgrímur Jónsson, a close relative on her father’s side. From 1933 to 1935 she also attended classes of Finnur Jonsson and Johann Briem. She moved to Copenhagen in 1935 where she studied art at the Royal Academy of Art. After graduating from the Academy in 1939 she spent time studying in Paris and was quite taken by the city.

== Career ==
In 1942, she and her fellow artist Louisa Matthíasdóttir moved to New York City to study at the Art Students League of New York and develop her art further. There she took an active part in the city’s art scene.

In 1949, she married Alfred L. Copley (alter ego: L. Alcopley). Later that year she went to Iceland for a short visit. There she was informed that she was not able to return to the United States because she was suspected of being a Communist sympathizer.

During her exile from the United States she lived in various places in Europe, Iceland being one of them. Copley joined her in Paris where they lived for a few years together with their daughter Una Dóra Copley, born 1951. During those years Nina kept making and practicing her art, exhibiting in many places and traveling through Europe. They returned to New York City in 1959 where Nína continued to work on her art and exhibiting mostly in Europe. During all her years abroad Nína kept exhibiting in Iceland and was her input very valuable to the art society in Iceland.

Mainly working in painting she also did paper collage, stained glass work, mosaic and more. She frequently based her compositions on nature where Icelandic landscape and the Nordic light played an important role.

== Death ==
She died on June 18, 1968, in New York.

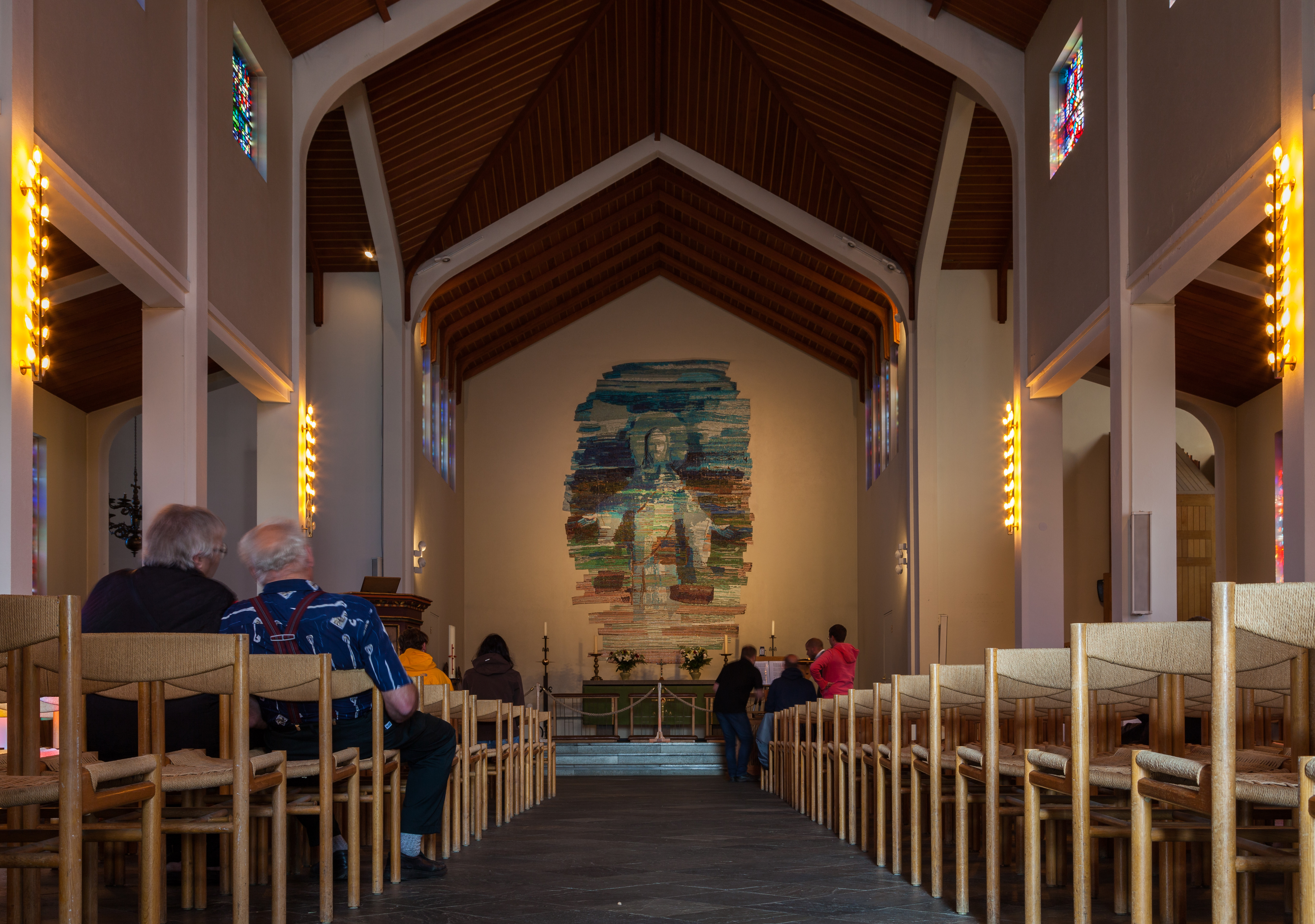
Painting by Tryggvadóttir in Skálholt

== Legacy and recognition ==
In 2012, a crater on Mercury was named after Tryggvadóttir.

In May 2018, the Reykjavík City Council signed a declaration of intent between the city and couple Una Dóra Copley and Scott Jeffries to set up an art museum dedicated to Nína Tryggvadóttir. The couple donated their art collection to the city.

In 2023, her work was included in the exhibition Action, Gesture, Paint: Women Artists and Global Abstraction 1940-1970 at the Whitechapel Gallery in London.

== See also ==
- List of Icelandic women artists
