= Rouleaux =

Stacks or aggregations of red blood cells

Rouleaux formation on a wet smear

Rouleaux (sing. rouleau) are stacks or aggregations of red blood cells (RBCs) that form due to the unique discoid shape of the cells in vertebrates. The flat surface of the discoid RBCs gives them a large surface area to make contact with and stick to each other; thus forming a rouleau. They occur when the plasma protein concentration is high, and, because of them, the ESR (erythrocyte sedimentation rate) is also increased. This is a nonspecific indicator of the presence of disease.

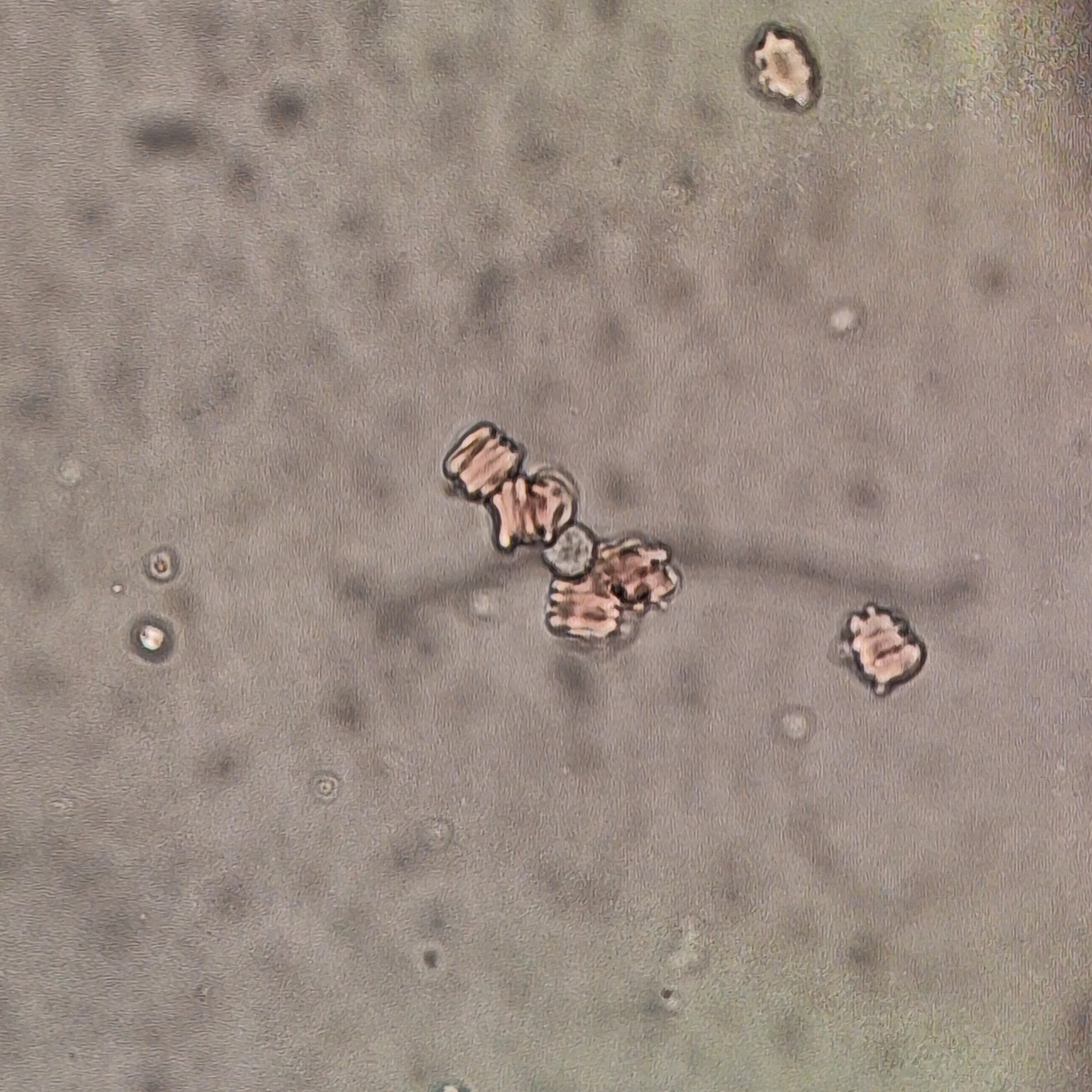
Rouleaux formation on a patient's vaginal swab wet smear

Conditions that cause rouleaux formation include infections, multiple myeloma, Waldenström's macroglobulinemia, inflammatory and connective tissue disorders, and cancers. It also occurs in diabetes mellitus and is one of the causative factors for microvascular occlusion in diabetic retinopathy.

So, the presence of rouleaux can also be a cause of disease because it will restrict the flow of blood throughout the body because capillaries can only accept free-flowing singular and independent red blood cells.

The aggregations, also known as "clumping," may also form as an allergic reaction to certain antibiotics and not necessarily because of the disease.

Acute-phase proteins, particularly fibrinogen, interact with sialic acid on the surface of RBCs to facilitate the formation of rouleaux. An increase in the ratio of RBCs to plasma volume, as seen in the setting of polycythemia and hypovolemia, decreases rouleaux formation and decreases sedimentation. Rouleaux formation is retarded by albumin proteins.

Rouleaux formations are also adopted by spermatozoa as a means of cooperation between genetically similar gametocytes so as to improve reproductive success through enhanced motility and, therefore, fertilization capacity—e.g., the guinea pig.

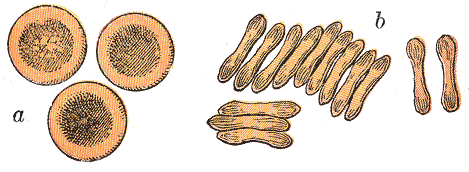
Typical mammalian erythrocytes: (a) seen from surface; (b) in profile, forming rouleaux.

== Kinetics of linear rouleaux formation ==
According to Smoluchowski aggregation, the kinetics of colloids is based on the assumption that each particle is surrounded by a "sphere influence". Single spherical particles which undergo Brownian motion collide and sticking of particles happens. As aggregation proceeds, the average diffusion constant of the aggregate population decreases. The aggregation of red blood cells progresses in the same manner except that cells are biconcave rather than spherical.

== See also ==
- Hemorheology
- Agglutinin
