= List of Ukrainian women artists =

This is a list of women artists who were born in Ukraine or whose artworks are closely associated with that country.

== A ==
- Emma Andijewska (born 1931), poet, painter
- Kateryna Antonovych (1884–1975), artist, children's book illustrator and professor of art history

== B ==
- Marie Bashkirtseff (1858–1884), diarist, painter, sculptor
- Tatiana Belokonenko (active since 1999), Ukrainian-born figurative painter now in Israel
- Svitlana Biedarieva (fl 2014), art historian, artist, curator
- Kateryna Vasylivna Bilokur (1900–1961), folk artist
- Seraphima Blonskaya (1870–1947), painter
- Kateryna Boloshkevich (1939–2018), weaver

== C ==
- Olena Chekan (1946–2013), film, stage and television actress, voice artist, television screenwriter and editor, political journalist and social activist, columnist, short story writer, essayist, humanist and feminist

== D ==
- Daria Denisova (born 1989), painter, book illustrator
- Daria Dorosh (born 1943), Ukrainian-American artist, educator, activist
- Sonia Delaunay (1885–1979), Ukrainian-French painter and designer

== E ==
- Aleksandra Ekster (1882–1949), painter, designer

== G ==
- Nina Genke-Meller (1893–1954), painter, designer, scenographer
- Victoria Gres (born 1964), fashion designer
- Olga Gurski (1902–1975), painter

== H ==
- Olesya Hudyma (born 1980), artist, poet, journalist

== K ==
- Anna K (born 1995), fashion designer
- Myroslava Kot (1933–2014), embroiderer, educator
- Victoria Kovalchuk (1954–2021), illustrator, designer, writer
- Nadiia Kushnir (born 1993), illustrator, designer, comic artist

== L ==
- Oksana Lytvyn (born 1961), textile artist

== M ==
- Hanlyna Mazepa (1910–1995) painter
- Alisa Margolis (born 1975), painter
- Anastasiya Markovich (born 1979), painter

== N ==
- Donia Nachshen (1903–1987), illustrator, poster artist

== O ==
- Arcadia Olenska-Petryshyn (1934–1996), painter
- Katerina Omelchuk (born 1982), painter
- Chana Orloff (1888–1968), sculptor

== P ==
- Alina Panova (born 1961), costume designer
- Anna Ivanovna Petrova (born 1962), painter, monument restorer
- Yuliya Polishchuk (born 1983), fashion designer
- Tetiana Protcheva (born 1962), embroiderer
- Maria Prymachenko (1908–1997), folk art painter
- Sasha Putrya (1977–1989), child artist

== R ==
- Olga Rapay-Markish (1929–2012), ceramist

== S ==
- Halyna Sevruk (1929–2022), painter, ceramist
- Kseniya Simonova (born 1985), artist, sand animator
- Marina Skugareva (born 1962), painter

== V ==
- Valentina (1899–1989), fashion designer

== Y ==
- Tetyana Yablonska (1917–2005), painter
- Yelena Yemchuk (born 1970), photographer, painter, film director

== Z ==
- Natasha Zinko (active since 2007), jewellery designer
- Halyna Zubchenko (1929–2000), painter, social activist
