= Denisov =

Denisov (masculine) or Denisova (feminine) is a Russian last name (Russian: Дени́сов/Дени́сова), which is derived from the male given name Denis and literally means Denis's. It is shared by the following people:

- Viktor Deni (1893–1946), born Viktor Denisov, Soviet satirist
- Aleksandr Denisov (born 1989), Russian footballer
- Aleksandr Nikolayevich Denisov (1955–2020), Soviet and Russian military officer
- Andrei Denisov (weightlifter) (born 1963), Israeli Olympic weightlifter
- Andrey Denisov (born 1952), Russian politician
- Daria Denisova (born 1989), Ukrainian artist
- Denis Denisov (born 1981), Russian ice hockey player
- Edison Denisov (1929–1996), Soviet composer
- Elena Denisova (born 1963), Austrian violinist
- Fedor Denisov, Imperial Russian general, suppressor of the Kościuszko Uprising
- Gennadi Denisov (born 1960), Uzbekistan footballer, father of Vitaliy
- Igor Denisov (born 1984), Russian footballer
- Kirill Denisov (born 1988), Russian judoka
- Lyubov Denisova (born 1971), Russian marathoner
- Lyudmyla Denisova (born 1960), Ukrainian politician
- Nikita Denisov (born 1986), Russian footballer
- Nikolai Denisov (1891–1959), Russian footballer
- Roman Denisov (footballer, born 1986), Russian football player
- Roman Denisov (footballer, born 1999), Russian football player
- Sergei Denisov (aviator)
- Sergei Denisov (hockey player)
- Vasily Orlov-Denisov (1775–1843), Cossack Russian general
- Viktor Denisov (born 1966), Russian canoer
- Vitaliy Denisov (born 1987), Uzbekistan footballer, son of Gennadi
- Vitaly Denisov (born 1976), Russian cross-country skier
- Vladimir Denisov (fencer) (born 1947), Russian Olympic fencer
- Vladimir Denisov (ice hockey) (born 1984), Belarusian ice hockey player
- Vyacheslav Denisov (born 1983), Uzbekistan basketball player

== Other ==
- Denisov family
- Denisova Cave, an archaeological site in Siberia.
  - Denisovan, the ancient hominin discovered in Denisova Cave
- Denisov District of northern Kazakhstan
