= Olena Chekan =

Ukrainian artist, writer (1946–2013)

- Олeнa Чeкaн
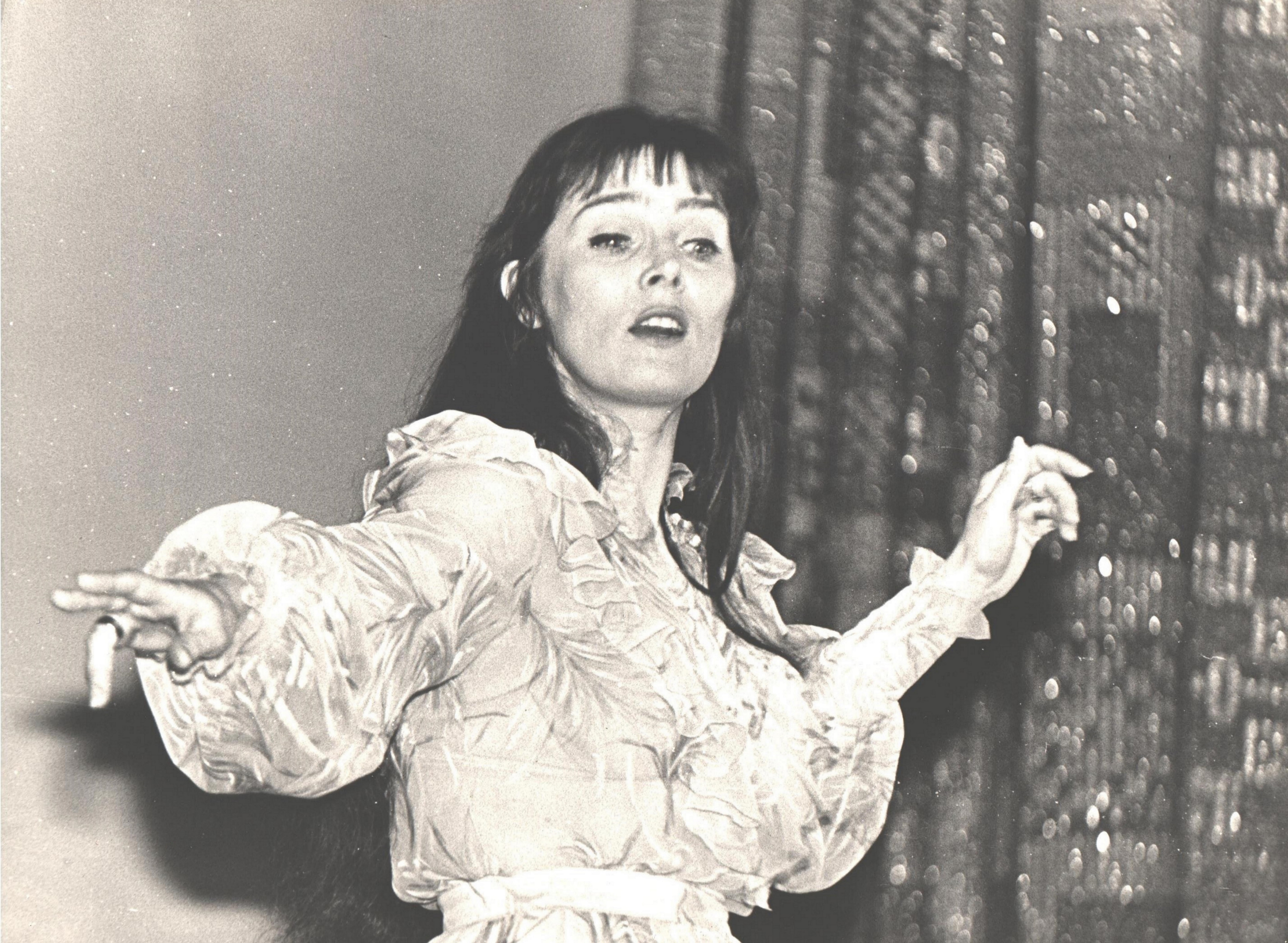
- Olena Chekan in 1983
- Born: Olena Vasilevna Chekan; 26 April 1946; Kyiv
- Died: 21 December 2013 (aged 67); Kyiv
- Occupations: Film actress, script writer, journalist

Olena Vasilivna Chekan (also Yelena Chekan, Ukrainian: Олeнa Вacилівнa Чeкaн, Polish: Helena Czekan, Serbian: Jelena Чекић; 26 April 1946, Kyiv, Soviet Union – 21 December 2013, Kyiv, Ukraine) was a Soviet and Ukrainian film actress, script writer and journalist.

== Early life ==
Chekan was born on 26 April 1946 in Kyiv. Her father was Vasily Ioannovich Chekan (28 December 1906 – 23 November 1986), mother Lyubov Pavlovna Tarapon (15 June 1914 – 19 July 1994). In 1972, she graduated from the Boris Shchukin Theatre Institute in Moscow. The artistic director of the course was Vladimir Etush. Chekan studied dramatic arts course in the same years, together with Natalya Gundareva and Konstantin Raikin.

== Career ==
She worked as an actress at the Moscow Drama Theater on Malaya Bronnaya, at the Moscow Pushkin Drama Theatre, at the Studio Theatre of a Film actor of the Alexander Dovzhenko Film Studios (Kyiv), at the Studio Theatre "Suzirya" ("Constellation") in Kyiv. She also worked on Ukrainian TV, at the Broadcast Studio 1+1 (TV Channel) as a creative editor of the "Document" project. Chekan worked at the Ukrainskyi Tyzhden (The Ukrainian Week) magazine as a journalist and assistant of editor-in-chief since the day of the magazine's foundation in 2007.

Chekan's first role in cinema was in Solaris by Andrei Tarkovsky. She was a popular and well known actress in the middle of the 1980s and she had more than 50 works in cinema including lead roles and secondary roles as well. Chekan also worked on more than 30 theater projects performing both leading and secondary roles. Chekan is a member of a Filmmaking Union of USSR and Ukraine and a member of a Union of Theater Workers of USSR and Ukraine.

Chekan is also known as a screenwriter and performer in several one-man performances dedicated to the work of Taras Shevchenko, Lesya Ukrainka, Vasyl Stus, Marina Tsvetaeva, Osip Mandelstam, Mikhail Bulgakov, Anna Akhmatova, Maximilian Voloshin, Alexander Blok, Boris Pasternak, Joseph Brodsky, Antoine de Saint-Exupéry, Federico García Lorca, with the musical illustrations (fragments of compositions of Bach, Vivaldi, Haydn, Mozart, Chopin).

Her numerous performances could be seen on the stage of Cinema House, Central House of Artists, Actors' House, Studio Theater "Constellation", in the Memorial House of Marina Tsvetaeva in Moscow, in Ukrainian Cultural Centers in Moscow and Saint Petersburg, in Literature-Memorial House to Mikhail Bulgakov in Kyiv (Mikhail Bulgakov Museum), in Memorial House of Maximilian Voloshin in Koktebel, in Alexander Grin house museum in Stary Krym (Old Crimea). The 73rd season of the Scientists' Club of Academy of Sciences of Ukraine in Kyiv was opened with her musical evenings and poetry parties. Chekan performed as a member of an artistic group of USSR State Film actors' group in her one-man-performances in front of the soldiers in Kabul and Bagram in Afghanistan in 1981–1982.

She was awarded with the memorial sign of the USSR Border Forces "For Merit to the Fatherland". Chekan recited poetry together with the famous Ukrainian poet Lina Kostenko in front of the fire fighters and Armed Forces personnel during the elimination of emergency at the burning Chernobyl Nuclear Power Plant in 1986. She also reported from Grozny as an independent and freelance journalist of Radio Free Europe/Radio Liberty during the First Chechen War in 1994–1996. She was also an author, moderator and presenter of the TV-program "Glimpses of Eternity" on Inter, in 2000 and a creative editor of the "Document" TV-program produced by Broadcast Studio 1+1 (TV Channel) 1+1 Media Group.

Chekan wrote together with Yuriy Makarov as a co-author a screenplay for the 4 parts documentary movie "My Shevchenko" which was the project of 1+1. The "My Shevchenko" film made in cooperation with Yuriy Makarov was nominated for Shevchenko Prize in 2002 (Shevchenko National Prize). She was also an author of an idea and a co-author of a screenplay of the documentary movie "Ivan Mazepa: Love. Greatness" (2005, directed by Yuriy Makarov, project of 1+1 (TV Channel) (Ivan Mazepa).

Chekan worked as a journalist and a columnist at the Ukrainsky Tyzhden (The Ukrainian Week) weekly magazine since its founding in 2007 as an assistant of an editor-in-chief Yuriy Makarov. She became an author of numerous articles and interviews, including her interviews with Václav Havel, André Glucksmann, Natalya Gorbanevskaya, Boris Nemtsov, Krzysztof Zanussi, Igor Pomerantsev, Akhmed Zakayev, Tomas Venclova, Valentyn Sylvestrov, Lina Kostenko, Sergey Krymsky, Myron Petrovsky, and other prominent people.

In the spring of 2012, Chekan was diagnosed with the fourth stage brain cancer. She died on 21 December 2013.

== Personal life ==
Chekan was married to Stanislas Rodyuk (1937–2003), an architect. Together, they had a son, Bohdan Rodyuk Chekan (born 1978).

== Filmography ==
Chekan worked as an actress in many films from 1980 to the 1990s, including:

- The Bothersome Man (1978)
- Family Circle (1979)
- Women Joke In Good Earnest (1981)
- To The Whizz of Bullets (1981)
- The Rooks (1982)
- The Secrets of St. George's Cathedral (1982)
- Three Shells of An English Rifle (1983)
- Haunted By Ghosts (1984)
- Life Bridge (1986)
- Premiere In Sosnovka (1986)
- Approaching Future (1986)
- By Your Side (1986)
- Start The Investigation (second film, Smear) (1987)
- Gypsy Aza (1987)
- Blue Rose (1988)
- Sinner (1988)
- How Men Were Talking About Women (1988)
- The Prisoner of Château d'If (1988)
- Storm Warning (1988)
- Road Through The Ruins (1989)
- I Want To Make A Confession (1989)
- Vehement (1990)
- Doping For Angels (1990)
- Niagara (1991)

== Publications ==
Chekan published book-interview Etoile d'Alex Moscovitch (The Star of Alex Moscovitch). This book was written by Chekan in Moscow in 1990–1991 on the basis of personal conversations and political memories by Alex Moscovitch, companion of General de Gaulle. The book-interview was published in Moscow at publishing house NORD in 1992 with the autobiography of Moscovitch Le Temps Des Punaises in Russian.

Her son, Bohdan Rodyuk-Chekan, initiated publishing of English translation of her creative works and collections of her best materials published previously in The Ukrainian Week. Austrian artist and publisher Robert Jelinek published the book titled The Quest for a free Ukraine in Vienna at the editorial house Der Konterffei in 2015. The second book, Hymns to Ukrainian Art, published in 2016, includes further interviews published in The Ukrainian Week as well as chapters on acting career and literary work.
