= Volodymyr Adamovych Ropetskyi =

Ukrainian sculptor and activist

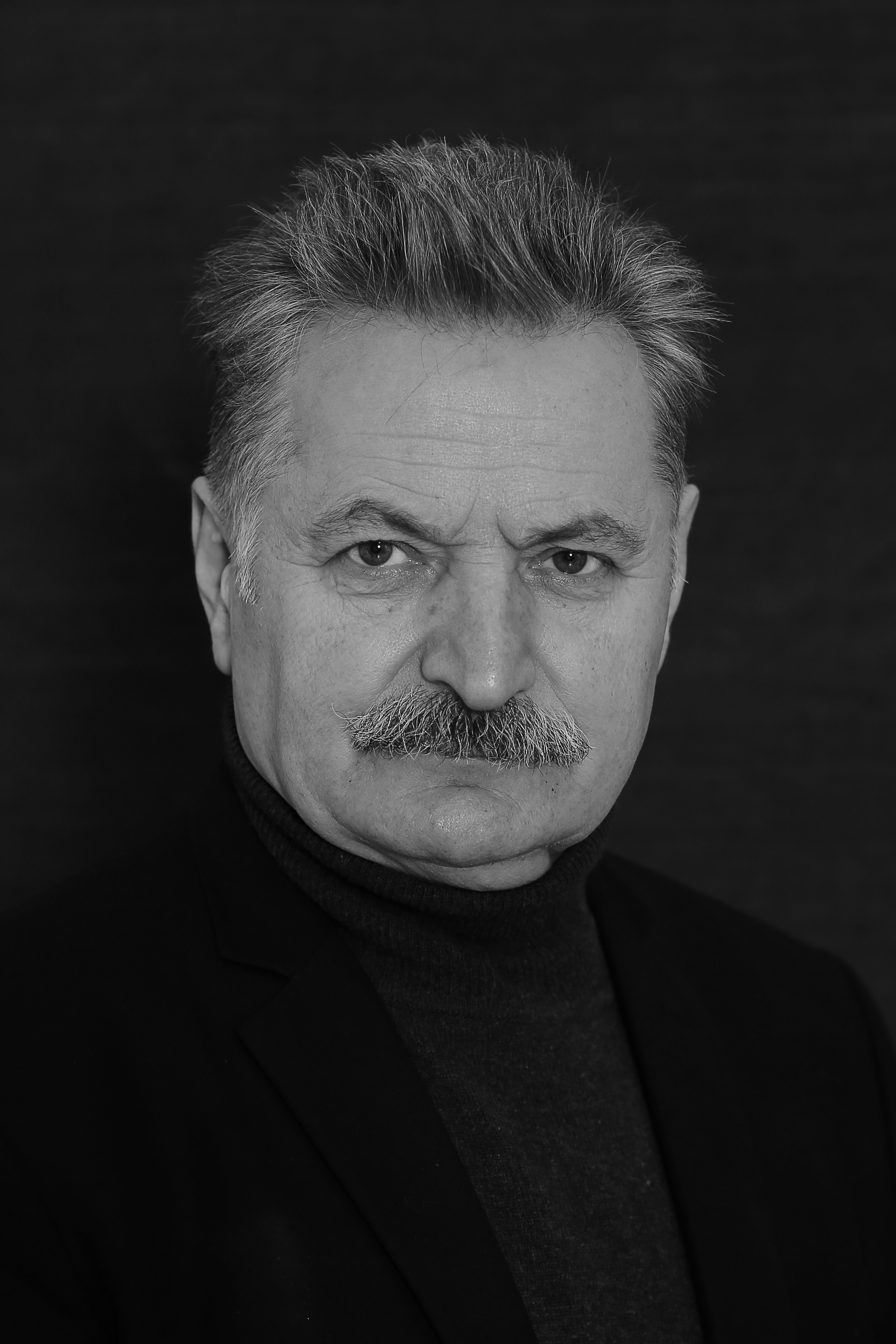
Ropetsky Volodymyr Adamovich

Volodymyr Adamovych Ropetskyi (Ukrainian: Володимир Адамович Ропецький; born November 11, 1953, in Mariampil) is a Ukrainian sculptor, monumental artist, painter, and Graphic designer. He is a member of the National Union of Artists of Ukraine, Honored Artist of Ukraine, pedagogue, associate professor at the Ukrainian Academy of Printing, public and political figure, and activist of the Lemko movement.

== Biography ==
Born on November 11, 1953, in the family of Adam Hiliarovych Ropetskyi and Paraskevia Hryhorivna Ropetska (née Kusyk), who were deported in 1945 from Lemkivshchyna (Poland) to the Ukrainian SSR. The family settled in Mariampil (formerly Marynopil), Halych Raion, Ivano-Frankivsk Oblast.

He graduated from Mariampil Secondary School (1971), Kosiv College of Folk Art (1974), and the Lviv Institute of Decorative and Applied Art (1979, now Lviv National Academy of Arts). Served in the Soviet Army (1979–1980). Worked as a monumental artist in Lviv artistic-production enterprises (1981–1992). From 2004, he has been an associate professor at the Department of Book Graphics and Printing Design at the Ukrainian Academy of Printing.

== Awards ==
- Merited Artist of Ukraine (2000).

=== Creative Works (selection) ===
- Sculptures of Taras Shevchenko in various cities.
- Memorial plaques and monumental works in Lviv and other regions.
- Lemko-themed works and ethnographic projects.

== Public Activity ==
Active in preserving Lemko culture, founder and leader of the All-Ukrainian Society "Lemko Region," organizer of festivals and conferences. Candidate for parliamentary and local elections.

== Creative activity ==
- "Virmenska Street" (1984, bronze, 10×9).
- "Serbska Street" (1984, bronze, 10×9).
- Easel work "Year 1941" (1984, tinted plaster, 55×25×27).
- "Kornyakta Tower" (1985, bronze, 18×8.2).
- "Lviv. April 1936" (1985, bronze, 11.5×9).
- "Ivan Franko" (1986, fireclay, diameter 58).
- "Markiyan Shashkevych" (1986, tinted plaster, 102×43×38).
- Memorial sign with a bas-relief to Taras Shevchenko in the village of Dobryany, Stryi district (1985, artist Dmytro Paruta).
- "Ripnyk" (1986, glass cement, 48×42×33).
- "Ripnyk" (1986, glass cement, 56×31×49).
- "Maria" (no later than 1989, plaster, 46×21×15.5).
- Monument to T. Shevchenko in the village of Snovychi (1993, architect V. Chornous).
- Monument to T. Shevchenko in Zboriv (1994).
- Monument to T. Shevchenko in Chortkiv (1995).
- Monument to Roman Rizniak - "Makomatsky" in Truskavets (1995).
- Memorial tablet to Okhrim Kravchenko at 26 Lysenko Street in Lviv (2008, architect Yaroslav Treskot).
