= Mitelman =

Russian painter

Savelii Yakovlevich Mitelman
- Born: 3 January 1940; Lyubertsy, Moscow Oblast
- Died: 21 December 2004 (aged 64)
- Education: Moscow Textile Institute

Savelii Yakovlevich Mitelman (Russian: Савелий Яковлевич Мительман); (3 January 1940 – 21 December 2004) was a Russian painter.

== Biography ==
He was born in Lyubertsy, Moscow Oblast and lived in Moscow. Savelii Mitelman was a representative of the underground. He graduated from the Moscow Textile Institute, the faculty of Applied Arts in 1966. His original creative style became noticeable in the beginning of seventies. In 1974 he took part in the exhibitions of nonconformists in Izmailovsky park and Belyayevo (the so-called Bulldozer Exhibition). In 1979 he entered the Joint Committee of graphic artists (it was subsequently transformed to the International Federation of Artists of UNESCO) and since then he had participated in the art life of this organization regularly. He was close to the Moscow underground art though did not belong to any particular group of it.

The first show of his works (slide-film) took place in 1985 in the House of Arts of VTO (Society of actors) in Shelykovo. His first personal exhibition (1986) in Malaya Gruzinskaya street, 28 was very successful. The number of his personal exhibitions exceeded thirty. He participated in the international salons in Moscow and Barcelona. His works were present at painting auctions in Gdańsk, London, and New York City. He did not adhere to any aesthetic direction though every his painting had its certain concept. The style problem had never been principal for him. Some of his largest shows were: exhibitions of the International Federation in "Manezh"; exhibition of the Associations "Ecology" and "Memories of victims of Stalinism" in Central House of Artists (CHA, Crymsky Val street); "The golden brush" - 1997, 1998, 1999.

His works are kept in galleries and private collections of about 30 countries including the State Central Museum of modern history of Russia (6 works), Museum of Mayakovsky (Moscow), Museum "Aleksanrovskaya Sloboda" in Aleksandrov, the gallery "Creativity Union" (Moscow, 43 works).

He is buried in Moscow, Russia in the Mitinskoe Cemetery).

== Personal exhibitions ==
- 1990, January - in Kuntsevo showroom;
- 1990 - Gdańsk, "Decline of idea";
- 1992 - gallery "Inter-Mars";
- 1994 September–October - the Union-Gallery;
- 1995 March–April - gallery Ostozhenka;
- 1995 August – CHA;
- 1996 - 2000 - five exhibitions in the gallery "Creativity Union".
- 1998 July–August – CHA;
- 2000 January - gallery Ramenki;
- 2000 March - Taganka, showroom;
- 2001 September – CHA;
- 2001 – Barcelona;
