= Roman Denisov =

Roman Denisov may refer to:

- Roman Denisov (footballer, born 1986), Russian football player
- Roman Denisov (footballer, born 1999), Russian football player
