= Sergei Denisov =

Sergei Denisov may refer to:

- Sergei Denisov (ice hockey)
- Sergei Denisov (aviator)
