= Serhiy Poyarkov =

Ukrainian illustrator (born 1965)

Sergey Poyarkov
- Сергій Поярков
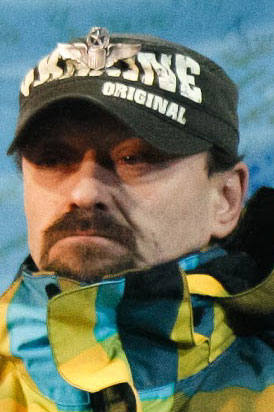
- Poyarkov in 2014
- Born: Serhiy Volodymyrovych Poyarkov; 18 October 1965 (age 60); Oster, Ukrainian SSR, Soviet Union
- Education: Ivan Fedorov Ukrainian Polygraph Institute; National Academy of Visual Arts and Architecture
- Occupations: Illustrator; television host
- Awards: Writers and Illustrators of the Future

Serhiy Volodymyrovych Poyarkov (Ukrainian: Сергій Володимирович Поярков; born 18 October 1965) is a Ukrainian illustrator who rose to prominence after winning the 1991 Writers and Illustrators of the Future Gold Award. Known for blending artistic expression with philosophical insight, Poyarkov celebrates his cultural heritage while embracing global influences, as reflected in his book Balance of Contradictions.

== Early life and education ==
Serhiy Volodymyrovych Poyarkov was born on 18 October 1965 in Oster, Chernihiv Oblast. He began his artistic education at the Department of Artistic Design at the Mykhailo Boichuk Kyiv State Academy of Decorative Applied Arts and Design, graduating in 1985. He then pursued further studies, earning a degree from the Ivan Fedorov Ukrainian Polygraph Institute Faculty of Book Art in 1990, and later graduated from the National Academy of Arts of Ukraine Faculty of Graphics in 1995.

== Career ==
From 1989 to 1991, Poyarkov worked in the press, contributing to magazines like Ogonek and Yunost, and newspapers such as Sobesednik and Komsomolskoye Znamya. He also illustrated books for publishing houses in Kyiv and began gaining international recognition with publications in Czechoslovakia, Sweden, and Bulgaria. In 1990, he won the prestigious main prize at the International L. Ron Hubbard Illustrator's Competition in Los Angeles. Between 1991 and 1992, he worked as a book illustrator in the United States, where he also claimed the Grand Prix at the "992 Fandom Directory" contest. Simultaneously, he worked in Kyiv in advertising, book illustration, and design.

Throughout the 1990s, Poyarkov participated in numerous prestigious exhibitions worldwide. In 1992, he showcased his work at the 53rd World Con Art Show in Glasgow. In 1993 and 1994, he won second place at the 54th World Con Art Show in Los Angeles and received an award for the best set of works. His exhibitions continued across global venues, including World Con events in San Antonio (1997) and Baltimore (1998), as well as Dragon Con in Atlanta, where he received the "Best in Show" award. Other notable exhibitions included group shows in Germany and personal exhibitions in Kyiv and New York. His works were also acquired by the Jane Voorhees Zimmerli Art Museum at Rutgers University, further cementing his international acclaim. Additionally, his artwork was shown in France and Germany.

Poyarkov has served as a judge for the Illustrators of the Future competition since 2000. In 2000, Poyarkov held personal exhibitions at the National Art Museum of Ukraine, the Odesa Museum of Western and Eastern Art, and the "Horod N" gallery in Kyiv, while also participating in the MegaCon 2000 exhibition in Orlando. In 2001, he was invited as the guest of honor at DemiCon 12 in Des Moines, and exhibited at the 60th World Con Art Show in Philadelphia. He also held a personal exhibition at the Kyiv Museum of Russian Art and participated in ArtExpo in New York. In 2002, Poyarkov's work was displayed in the Moscow Museum of Modern Art, and was nominated for the prestigious Locus Award. During the Orange Revolution in 2004, he gained public attention for his outspoken stance and satirical cartoons, which led to his participation in political talk shows.

Poyarkov has occasionally participated in various social gatherings and television shows. He was one of the key organizers of Automaidan and played a significant role during the Euromaidan protests, leading a grassroots movement that used motorcades to support the protests and apply pressure on the government. In 2014, he ran for parliament as an independent candidate but was unsuccessful. The following year, he attempted to secure a seat on the Khmelnytskyi Oblast Council, though that effort also did not result in election. Poyarkov later claimed that alongside the heroes who sacrificed their lives for Ukraine, there was also "a group of snat and nasty rats" within the Maidan movement. He accused several figures involved in the movement of exploiting patriotism for personal gain, alleging that some had negotiated with President Viktor Yanukovych for positions and facilitated corruption. He specifically criticized then-prime minister Arseniy Yatsenyuk for perpetuating a corrupt system.

From 2016 to 2017, Poyarkov was one of the hosts of the programme Subjective Results on the NewsOne channel. In 2017, he also served as an assistant consultant to Dmytro Yarosh, a People's Deputy of Ukraine (MP) and leader of the Right Sector, and became a frequent guest on various Ukrainian television news programmes. From 2018 to 2020, Poyarkov hosted and authored Poyarkov NEWS on the TV channel Priamyi, but the programme was eventually shut down following an investigation by the National Council for Television and Radio Broadcasting into the presenter's conduct. As of 2024, Poyarkov runs a blog on YouTube.

== Political career ==
Over the years, he worked as an assistant to various members of the Verkhovna Rada across multiple convocations: during the IV convocation, he assisted Ihor Hryniv of the Our Ukraine Bloc; in the V convocation, he worked with Serhii Osika from the Yulia Tymoshenko Bloc; and again in the VI convocation with Hryniv, now also with the Yulia Tymoshenko Bloc. In the VII convocation, he served as assistant to non-factional deputy Oles Donii; in the VIII, to Dmytro Yarosh, also non-factional; and in the IX convocation, he worked with Andriy Parubiy of European Solidarity.

== Controversies ==
=== Prioritising sales over parliamentary duties ===
Poyarkov's head to the Verkhovna Rada was accused by the media of selling his sculptures and paintings rather than serving as the MP's aide. Data indicates that over a hundred officials and MPs, including Vitali Klitschko and Oleksiy Azarov, the son of former Prime Minister Mykola Azarov, bought his work. According to the media, his sculptures cost ₴7000, while the paintings cost ₴10,000. Even the direct question of whether Poyarkov made a million dollars on the deputies was posed to him. The artist responded by saying, "The amount of your forecast is significantly underestimated."

=== Confrontation with Oles Buzina ===
In March 2011, during a discussion about Taras Shevchenko on Yevhen Kiselev's talk show "Great Politics", Poyarkov had a heated altercation with the controversial pro-Russian writer and public figure Oles Buzina. Poyarkov accused Buzina of writing an article about him for money, stating that Buzina's actions lacked principle. In response, Buzina became agitated, denied the accusation, and threatened violence, prompting security to intervene and remove him from the studio.

=== Driving controversies ===
On 10 October 2011, Poyarkov hit a pedestrian while driving a Toyota Land Cruiser near Bessarabska Square in Kyiv, close to a Party of Regions camp. The pedestrian, who was conscious but in pain shock, was attended to by an ambulance. Poyarkov stated that while turning from Baseina Street to Shevchenko Boulevard, three pedestrians crossed his path and one was struck. He claimed he was driving at a speed of 40 kilometres per hour (25 mph).

On 16 January 2014, the Pecherskyi District Court of Kyiv ruled to revoke Poyarkov's driver's licence for six months and imposed a court fee of ₴36.54. The decision, issued by judge Viktor Kytsyuk, found Poyarkov guilty of an unspecified offence. Following the verdict, Poyarkov announced his intention to appeal. This ruling came just one day after another Automaidan activist, Serhii Khazhinov, was similarly banned from driving for three months by the Holosiivskyi District Court.

=== Threats to the president ===
In 2019, Poyarkov caused controversy on his programme Poyarkov NEWS by calling President Volodymyr Zelenskyy an "uneducated green chm" who needed to be "educated." This prompted the National Council for Television and Radio Broadcasting to launch an investigation into the channel for insulting the president’s dignity. Zelenskyy filed a lawsuit against Poyarkov, and the Security Service of Ukraine (SBU) later suspected him of threatening the president’s life, which led to a criminal case. Poyarkov was released under personal obligation, and despite at least six court hearings, neither Poyarkov nor Zelenskyy were questioned. In a related act of protest, Poyarkov painted the slogan "Zelya – kh#ylo" on his fence in support of Oleksandr Tarnavskyi, a local Natskorpus leader who had been accused of hooliganism for using the same phrase. Police responded but took no further action. In January 2020, the SBU filed a lawsuit against Poyarkov under Part 1 of Article 346 of the Criminal Code, which provides for up to five years in prison for threatening the president. The Shevchenkivskyi District Court in Kyiv later discharged Zelenskyy's case against Poyarkov on personal duty.

== Personal life ==
Poyarkov is married to Irina Poyarkova, and they have two children: a daughter named Sophia and a son named Mark. In the summer of 2024, he underwent heart surgery.

== Honours and awards ==
Poyarkov has been awarded the following:

- Writers and Illustrators of the Future Gold Award (1991)
