= Grisha Bruskin =

Russian artist

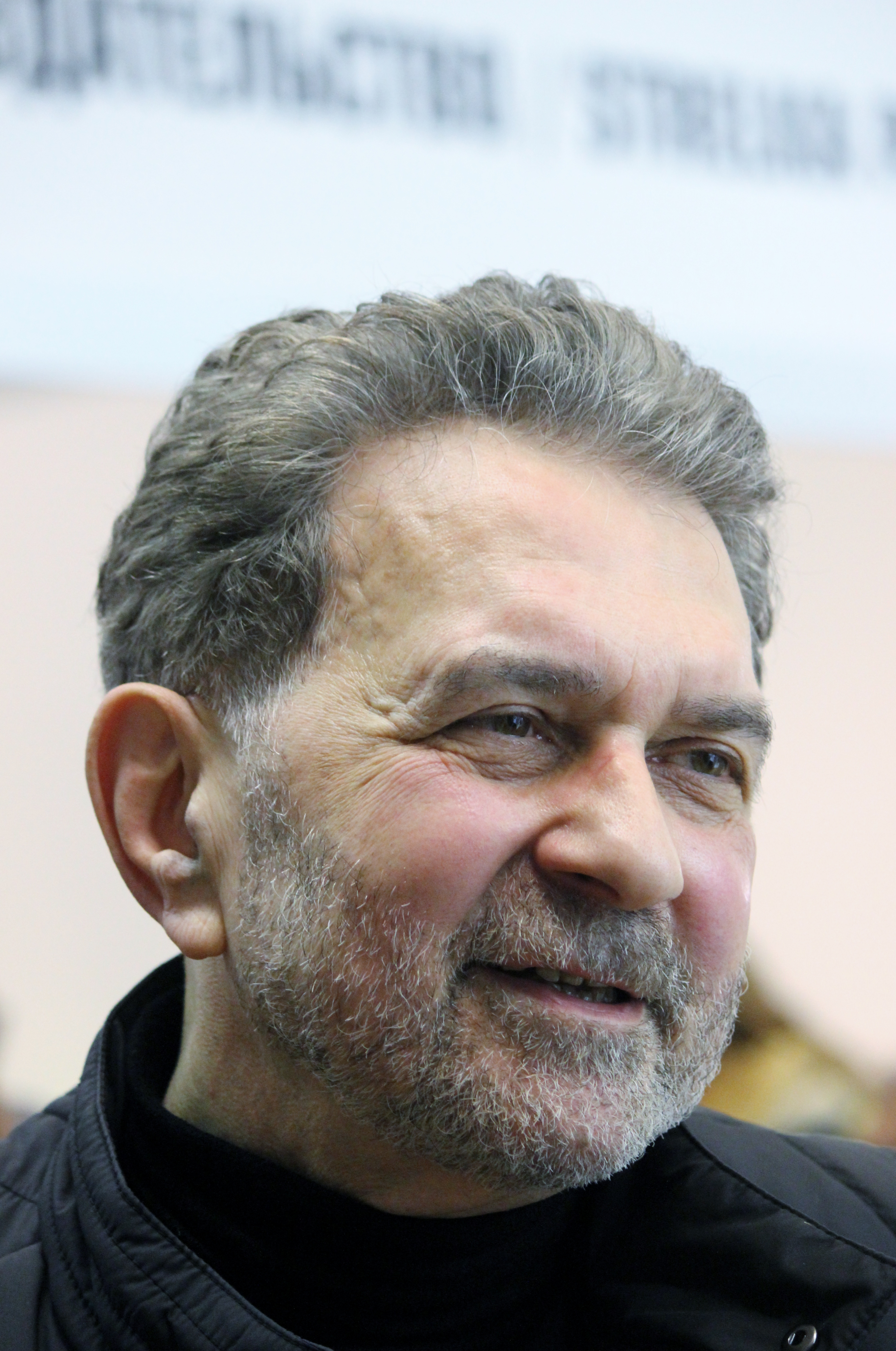
Bruskin at the 20 Moscow International Fair Non/fiction 2018

Grisha Bruskin (full name Григо́рий Дави́дович Бру́скин, Grigórij Davídovich Brúskin, born 1945) is a Russian and American artist.

== Biography ==
He was born in Moscow. Between 1963 and 1968, he studied at the Moscow Textile Institute (Art Department). In 1969, he became a member of the Artists' Union of the USSR.

He relocated to New York in 1988. In 1999, at the invitation of the German government and as a representative of Russia, Bruskin created a monumental triptych, Life Above All, for the reconstructed Reichstag in Berlin. In 2001 he published a memoir-style book, Past Imperfect. Bruskin lives and works in New York and Moscow.

== Awards ==
- In 2012 he received the Kandinsky Prize in the "Project of the Year" category, for his project, H-Hour.
- In 2019 he was awarded the Fiddler on the Roof Award in the Legendary Person category.

== Exhibitions ==
- 2012, Grisha Bruskin, H-Hour Multimedia Art Museum, Moscow

== Books ==
- 2001. Past Imperfect. ISBN 5-86793-121-8 Novoye Literaturnoye Obozreniye; 2nd ed. 2007.
- 2002. Das Alphabet des Grisha Bruskin. ISBN 3-935414-08-0 Kunsthalle in Emden.
- 2003. Yours Truly. ISBN 5-86793-199-4 Novoye Literaturnoye Obozreniye.
- 2005. Letter Follows. ISBN 5-86793-395-4 Novoye Literaturnoye Obozreniye.
- 2006. Alefbet. Tapestry. Palace Editions; Russian language edition) ISBN 5-93332-194-X, ISBN 3-938051-42-6.

Painting from cycle Logias

- 2008. Life is Everywhere. Palace Editions; Russian language edition ISBN 3-935298-00-5; English language edition ISBN 3-935298-00-5.
- 2008. Direct and Indirect Objects. SBN 978-5-86793-566-5 Novoye Literaturnoye Obozreniye.
- 2008. Past Imperfect: 318 Episodes from the Life of a Russian Artist. ISBN 978-0-8156-0901-8, ISBN 0-8156-0901-9 Syracuse University Press.
- 2010. Alefbet. Tapisserie (English and French languages edition). ISBN 978-2-35906-024-9 Lienart.
- 2011. Towards Bruskin. ISBN 978-5-86793-843-7. Novoye Literaturnoye Obozreniye.
- 2012. H-Hour (Russian language edition). ISBN 978-5-93977-066-8. Multimedia Art Museum.
- 2013. H-Hour (English language edition) ISBN 978-3-86678-787-2 Kerber Art.
- 2013. Archaeologist's Collection (Russian language edition). ISBN 978-5-9904620-1-4 Breus.
- 2014. Archaeologist's Collection (English language edition). ISBN 978-3-86678-883-1 Kerber Art.
- 2015. Alefbet. Alfabeto della memoria/The Alphabet of Memory. (Italian and English language edition) ISBN 978-88-6322-258-6 Terra ferma.
- 2015. An Archaeologist's Collection. (English language edition) ISBN 978-88-6322-266-1 Terra Ferma.
