= Moscow State Textile University =

- Московский государственный текстильный университет имени А. Н. Косыгина
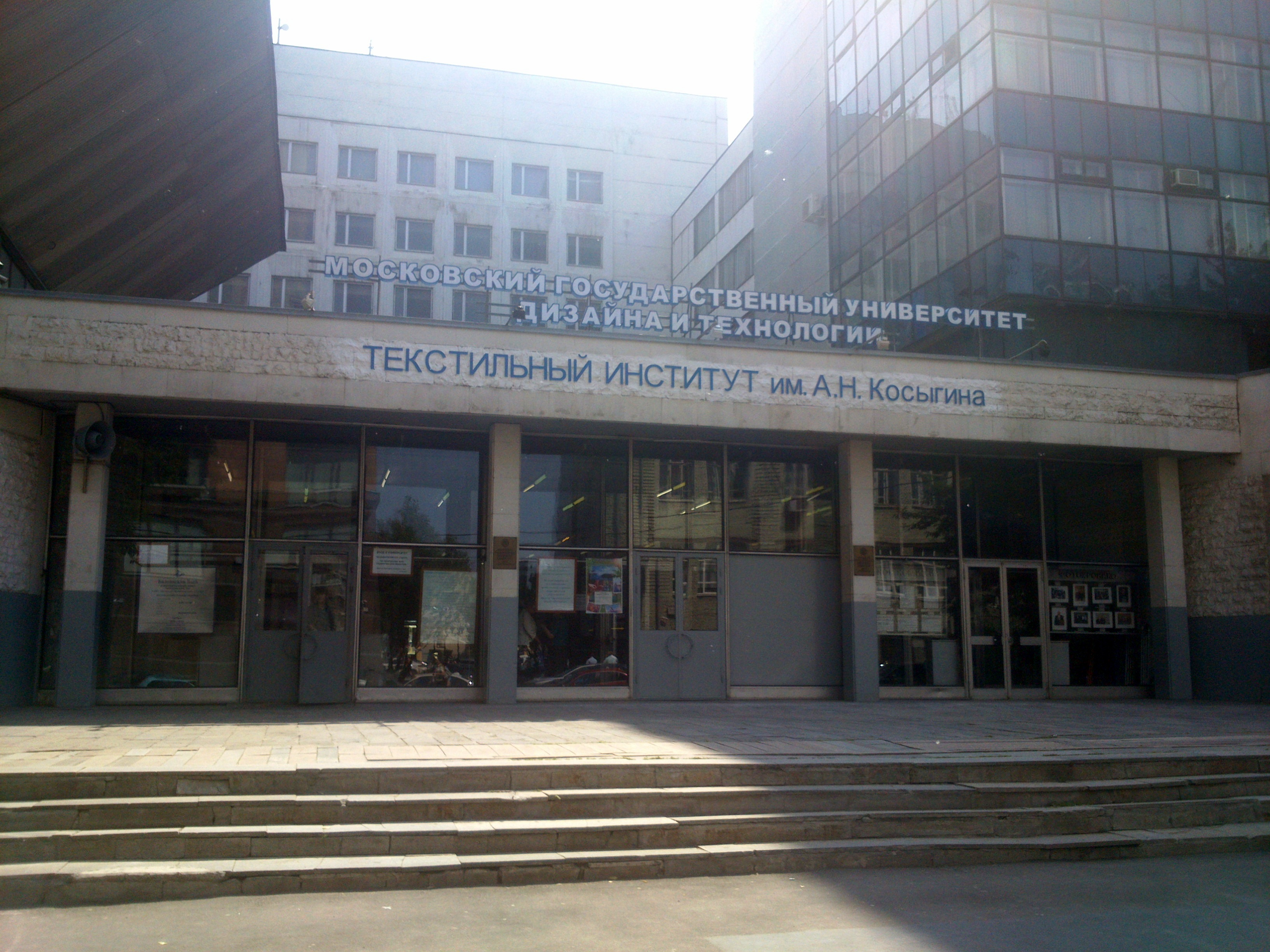
- Type: Public university
- Established: 1919
- Address: 1 Malaya Kaluzhskaya str., Moscow, Russia; 55°43′13″N 37°36′05″E
- Language: Russian
- Website: rguk.ru

Kosygin Moscow State Textile University (formerly Moscow State Textile Institute) was formed in 1919. It is one of the oldest and institutes for higher studies in textiles in Russia.

== History ==
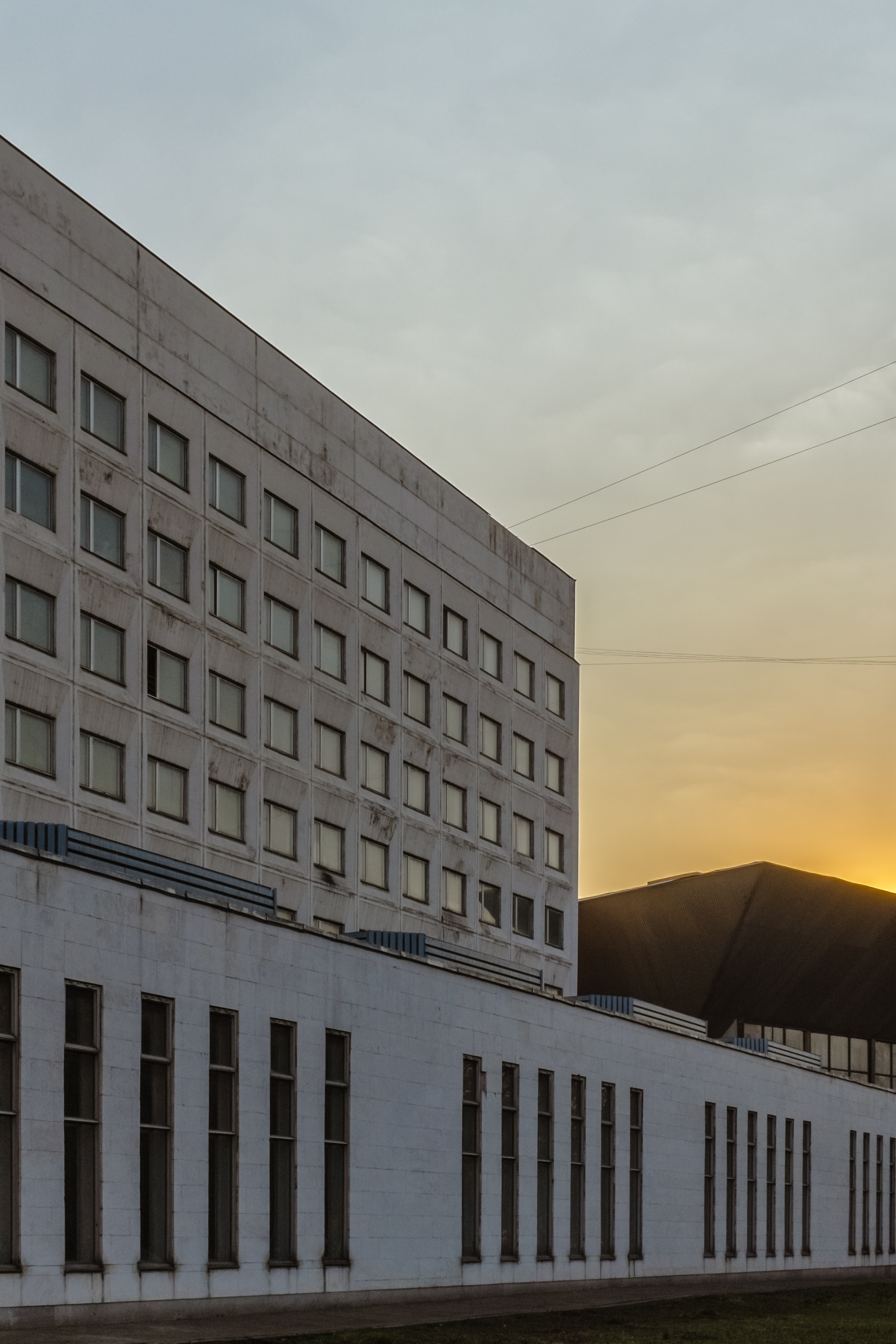

In 1981, the institute was named in honor of Soviet Premier Alexei Kosygin, who died the previous year and whose profession was in the textile industry. The institute was upgraded to "Academy" in 1990. It was renamed to A. N. Kosygin Moscow State Textile Academy. Nine years later, the Academy was approved as University and renamed as the A. N. Kosygin Moscow State Textile University in 1999.

== About ==
The university maintains a dedicated complex comprising eight buildings situated in the center of Moscow, Russia.

The teaching staff at the university is above 560, with 110 of them are Ph.D. and Professors.

The university has the following major departments:

- Technology and Production Management
- Chemical Technology and Ecology
- Weaving, Information Technology
- Automation and Energy
- Economics and Management
- Fashion Designing

The university offers specialization, masters and bachelors in 18 different categories. University has 41 departments, where it offer studies to almost 6700 students. The university has 110 laboratories and 100 auditoriums. The university has its own sports hall, club and three hostels.

The University has served as a center of education for students from Russia and from all over the world. Students from China, Pakistan, Morocco, Iran, Ghana and India have completed their higher education at the university. The university has a one-room mosque which was built by Muslim students of the university in the hostel at Shablovskaya.

== Alumni ==
- Denis Simachev
- Grisha Bruskin
- Larisa Sergeeva
- Olga Tolstikova
- Slava Zaitsev
- Victoria Gres
- Alvina Shpady
