= Transcarpathian Academy of Arts =

Art school in Uzhhorod, Ukraine

- Ukrainian: Закарпатська академія мистецтв
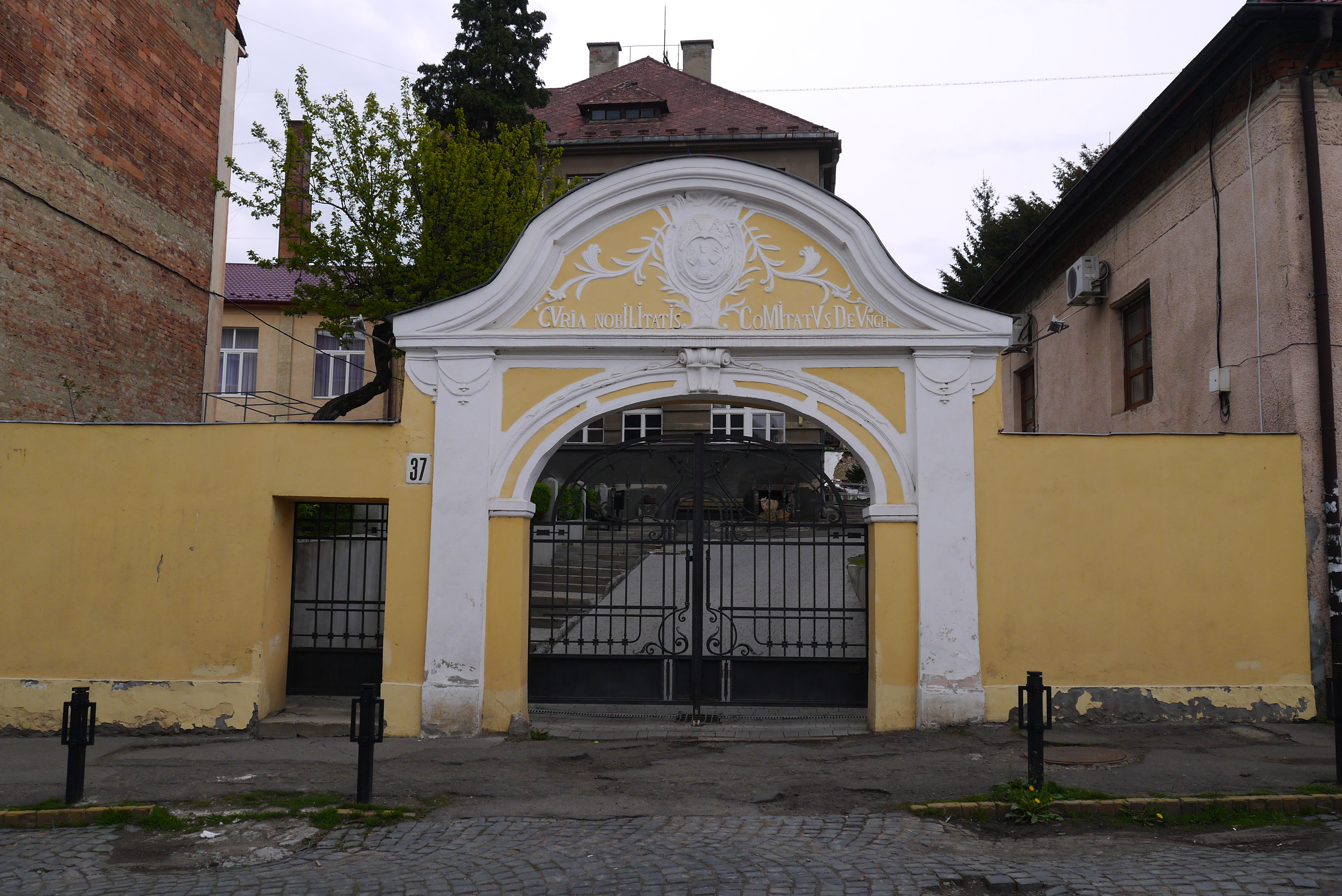
- Established: 2003
- Rector: Mykhailo Pryimych
- Students: 568
- Location: 38/80 Mynaiska St. (legal); 37 Voloshyna St. (physical rector’s office), Uzhhorod, Zakarpattia, 88015, Ukraine
- Website: zam.edu.ua

The Transcarpathian Academy of Arts is a post-secondary academic art institute. It was founded in 2003 and is located in Uzhhorod, Ukraine.

== History ==
Adalbert Erdeli and Joseph Bokshay, graduates of the Royal Hungarian Art Institute, decided to establish an art school. Erdeli settled in Mukachevo and became a teacher in the school and teachers' seminary from 1916 to 1922. The initial institution was a public school founded in 1927, and the first art school in Transcarpathia was founded in March 1946. It was called the Uzhgorod State Arts and Crafts College and was led by Erdeli.

In December 1965, the institution was subordinated to the Ministry of Local Industry of the USSR and renamed Uzhgorod College of Applied Arts. From 1998 to 2004, the college held bachelor's degree training for integrated curricula.

== Campuses ==
The main building, where drawing, painting and composition and font computer classes are held, is in Uzhhorod at Voloshin, 37 in the historic part of the city. Building "A" of the academy from the same period is partially preserved. Building "B" of the academy was built in the 1930s Bohemian style constructivism.

Also located in Uzhhorod are a library, dormitory, workshops and a gym. 42 classrooms have been created for classes at the academy, including 14 drawing classes and 10 workshops. There is a computer center for students, which includes six computer laboratories connected to the Internet. The academy has a museum that is used for exhibiting the best graduate works.

In the center of Mukachevo, there are classrooms in the "White House" of the Rákóczi family, which was built in the mid-17th century as the residence of the Transylvanian princes. Initially, it was a one-story building with a style reminiscent of the Renaissance, which consisted of only five rooms. After the rebellion of Francis II Rákóczi (1704−1711), the palace passed to the Schönborn family and was rebuilt. The reconstruction was carried out by Balthasar Neumann (1687−1753), a famous Würzburg architect at that time. According to his plans, a building with a wing symmetrical to the old building was added to the old part on the right side.

== Institutes and faculties ==
The academy was formed with three departments, two of which are graduate departments.

=== Department of Design ===
Founded in 2004, it prepares bachelor and master-level specialists in graphic design, interior design, and environment design. It has full-time and part-time learning.

=== Department of Fine and Decorative and Applied Arts ===
Created in 2004, the department trains bachelor-level students in the following majors: painting, metalwork, ceramics and woodworking. It has full-time and part-time learning. Experienced teachers are also engaged to teach professional subjects. Most of the teachers are members of the Union of Artists (NSHU).

The Ministry of Education and Science, Youth and Sports of Ukraine annually holds the All-Ukrainian Painting Olympiad at the academy.

=== Department of Education and Social Sciences ===
In this department, the following disciplines are taught: pedagogy and psychology, cultural studies, history of Ukraine; aesthetics; ethnopsychology, foundations of law; basics of economic theories; Ukrainian business language, philosophy, copyright, religious studies, sociology and political science, basics of management and marketing, teaching methods of special disciplines and others.

The department held the annual national conference "Erdeliv Readings"; since 2008, the Scientific Bulletin of the Transcarpathian Art Institute has been published, where articles in the fields of pedagogy, design, art history and art education are published.

== Notable staff ==
- Odarka Sopko, artist and graphic painter

== Notable alumni ==
- A. Bockotey, rector of the Lviv National Academy of Arts
- P. Balázs, Hungarian professor and philanthropist
