= Odarka Sopko =

Ukrainian painter (born 1963)

- Одарка Сопко
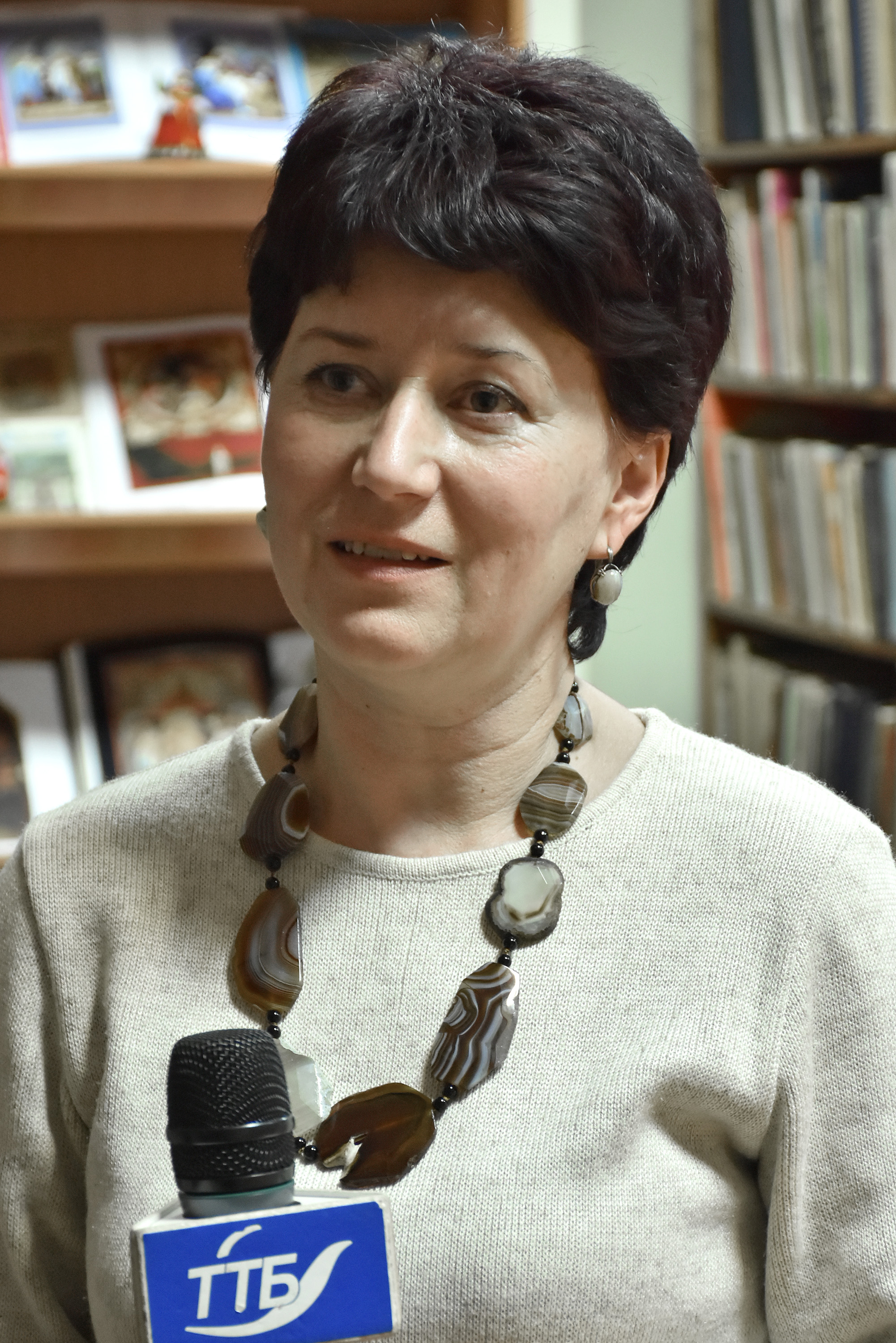
- Odarka in 2016
- Born: Odarka Ivanivna Dolhosh; 14 April 1963 (age 63); Uzhhorod, Zakarpattia Oblast, Ukrainian SSR, Soviet Union
- Education: Ukrainian Academy of Printing
- Occupations: Graphic painter and polygraphist
- Honours: see here

Odarka Ivanivna Spoko (Ukrainian: Одарка Іванівна Споко) (née Dolhosh; Ukrainian: Долгош born 5 April 1955) is a Ukrainian polygraphist, artist and graphic painter. She is known for her floristic paintings and artwork with inventive layering methods.

== Early life and education ==
Born on 14 April 1963, in the Ukrainian city of Uzhhorod. Odarka received her diploma from the Ukrainian Academy of Printing in Lviv. She also holds a Ph.D. in art history from the Transcarpathian Academy of Arts.

She began her career in 1978 at the Uzhhorod School of Applied Arts. She then worked as a designer for the art and production plant in 1982, as an associate professor in the Department of Design at the Transcarpathian Academy of Arts in 2004, as chief art editor of the publishing house "Transcarpathia" in 1988, and as a teacher in the Uzhhorod College of Arts' design department in 2002.

== Works ==
Odarka became a member of the National Union of Artists of Ukraine in 1995. In 2000, she became the Chair of the Association of Creative Women of Transcarpathia. Earned the title of Candidate of Art History in 2012, specializing in fine arts, and was later appointed as an associate professor at the institution's Department of Design.

The NGO "The Association of Creative Women of Transcarpathia 'Nova Forma'" presented an all-Ukrainian art project titled "Art unifies Ukraine" on 31 August 2017, in Chernivtsi. The initiative included four Transcarpathian female artists, including Odarka.

Actively engaged in exhibition activities with 12 personal exhibitions to date. Odarka's works are included in collections in Australia, Slovakia, Hungary, and Ukraine. Additionally, participates in various cultural and artistic projects as both an organizer and a participant. She often participates in both foreign and domestic outdoor and international exhibitions. Individual displays in Uzhhorod in 1993, 1995, and 2003; Slovakia in 1998, 200, 2005, and 2006; Mukachevo in 2003; Kyiv in 2004. Her paintings may be seen at modern art galleries in Námestovo, Bratislava, Budapest, and the Transcarpathian Museum of Art.

== Awards and honours ==
Valentyna has earned the following awards and honours:

- Honored Art Worker of Ukraine (2017)
- Order of Merit Third Class (2007)
- Order of Princess Olga Third Class (2007)
- Candidate of Art History at the Transcarpathian Academy of Arts
