= Larisa Sergeeva =

Soviet and Russian artist, designer, and teacher (1946-)

Larisa Sergeevna Sergeeva (Russian: Лари́са Серге́евна Серге́ева; born March 7, 1946, Yalta) is a Soviet and Russian artist, designer, and teacher.

== Recognition and awards ==
She is an honoured artist of the Russian Federation (2013) and an honorary artist of the Autonomous Republic of Crimea (2009). She is a member of the Creative Union of Russian Artists, the Union of the Russian Designers, the Association of Art Critics of the Creative Union of Art historians and Art Critics, Asociación Pintores Pastelistas Españoles - ASPAS, L'association de pastellistes L'art de cœur de l'art de Lyon en France, Emeritus guest of the Ministry of Culture of Italy (2008).

== Career ==
She is a teacher of the highest category, a licensed expert in children's art in the city of Moscow and greater Moscow region.
