= Ukrainian Academy of Printing =

University in Lviv, Ukraine

- ДЗВО «Українська академія друкарства»
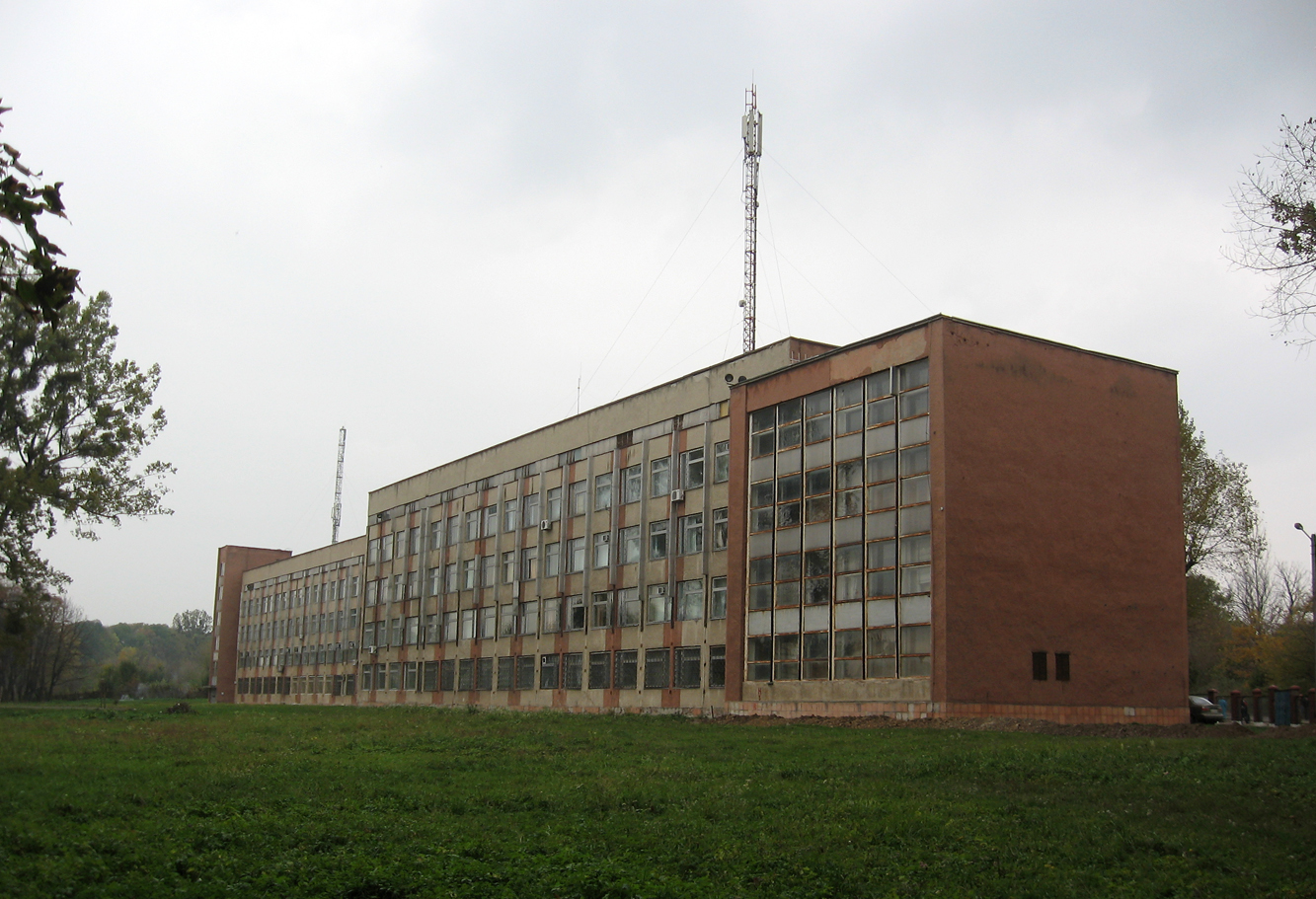
- Former name: Український поліграфічний інститут імені Івана Федорова (1930-1994)
- Type: Public
- Established: 1930 (in Kharkiv)
- Affiliations: Ministry of Education and Science of Ukraine
- Rector: Bohdan Durnyak
- Students: 6 600
- Location: Lviv, Ukraine
- Campus: Pidholosko st., 19, 79020
- Website: uad.edu.ua

The Ukrainian Academy of Printing (Ukrainian: Українська академія друкарства) is a Ukrainian academy in Lviv.

== History ==
Specialist's training for printing branch in Ukraine started in 1930 in the School of Printing Art founded by Stefan Kulzhenko. Founded in 1917 in Kyiv, the Ukrainian Art Academy has become the first higher arts educational institution with a graphic workshop in the history of Ukraine.

In 1922 the academy was reorganized in Kyiv Institute of Plastic Arts. In the year 1923 Kyiv Art Institute was created (today it’s the National Academy of Visual Arts and Architecture) by the way of uniting Kyiv Institute of Plastic Arts and Kyiv Architecture Institute. The same year on the base of Kyiv Art Institute was created the printing faculty by the way of uniting of the graphic department of the Institute with the School of Printing Art. 50 students entered this faculty. They studied on the next three specializations: book and newspaper printing, color printing and printing of the stamps and illustrated magazines друк. Famous painter professor A. Kh. Sereda became the head of the faculty. At the same time printing faculties in the Art Institutes in Kharkiv, Odessa, Moscow and Leningrad were opened.

== Campuses and buildings ==
- Main Building in Lviv, Pidholosko street, 19
- Faculty of Publishing, Printing and Information Technology (Pidholosko st., 19)
- Faculty of Economics and Book Science (Pidholosko st, 19)
- Faculty of Computer and Printing Engineering (Pidholosko st., 19)
- Extra Mural Department (Pidvalna st., 17)
- Center of After-Diploma Education (Pidvalna st., 17)
- Preparatory department (Pidholosko st, 19)
- Crimean Institute of Information and Printing Technologies (Simpheropol, Pushkina.st, 35)
- Lviv Printing College (Lviv, Mytna square, 1)
- Department of Work with the Foreign Companies and Institutions
- Department of Work with Foreign Students
- Scientific and Technical Library
- UAP Publishing House
- Training and Production Experimental Printing House
- Training and Demonstration Centre of "Heidelberg" Company

== Institutes and faculties ==
FACULTY OF COMPUTER PRINTING ENGINEERING Directions and specialities:

- Engineering Mechanics
- Technology of Machine Building (Engineering Technology)
- Packing Machines and Technology
- Printing Machines and Automated Systems
- Automation and Computer Integrated Technologies
- Automated Control of Technology Process
- Computer-Integrated Technological Processes and Production

PUBLISHING AND PRINTING INFORMATION TECHNOLOGY FACULTY Directions and specialities:

- Publishing and Printing
- Printed Editions Technology
- Technology of Development, Production and Design of Packaging
- Computer Technologies and Systems of Publishing and Printing Production
- Technology of Electronic Multimedia Editions
- Materials for Publishing and Printing production
- Art
- Fine and Applied Arts

ECONOMY AND BOOK BUSINESS FACULTY Directions and specialities:

- Journalism
- Publishing and Editing
- Advertising and Public Relations
- Economics and Entrepreneurship
- Economics of Enterprise
- Accounting and Auditing
- Marketing
- Trade
- Commodity and Commercial Activity

== Notable alumni ==
- Pavlo Arie — screenwriter, translator, playwright
- Aleksandr Aksinin — graphics artist
- Yuri Andrukhovych — poet, novelist, translator and essayist
- Sergei Balenok — graphic artist, painter, illustrator
- Viktor Merezhko — screenwriter, film director, playwright, actor, writer, TV presenter
- Nicholas Zalevsky — Ukrainian-American artist
- Danil "Dendi" Ishutin - A professional eSports player
- Sergey Poyarkov – artist and public figure
- Odarka Sopko – artist and graphic painter
- Nadiia Kushnir (born 1993), illustrator, designer, comic artist

== See also ==
List of universities in Ukraine
