= Yuriy Makarov =

Ukrainian journalist

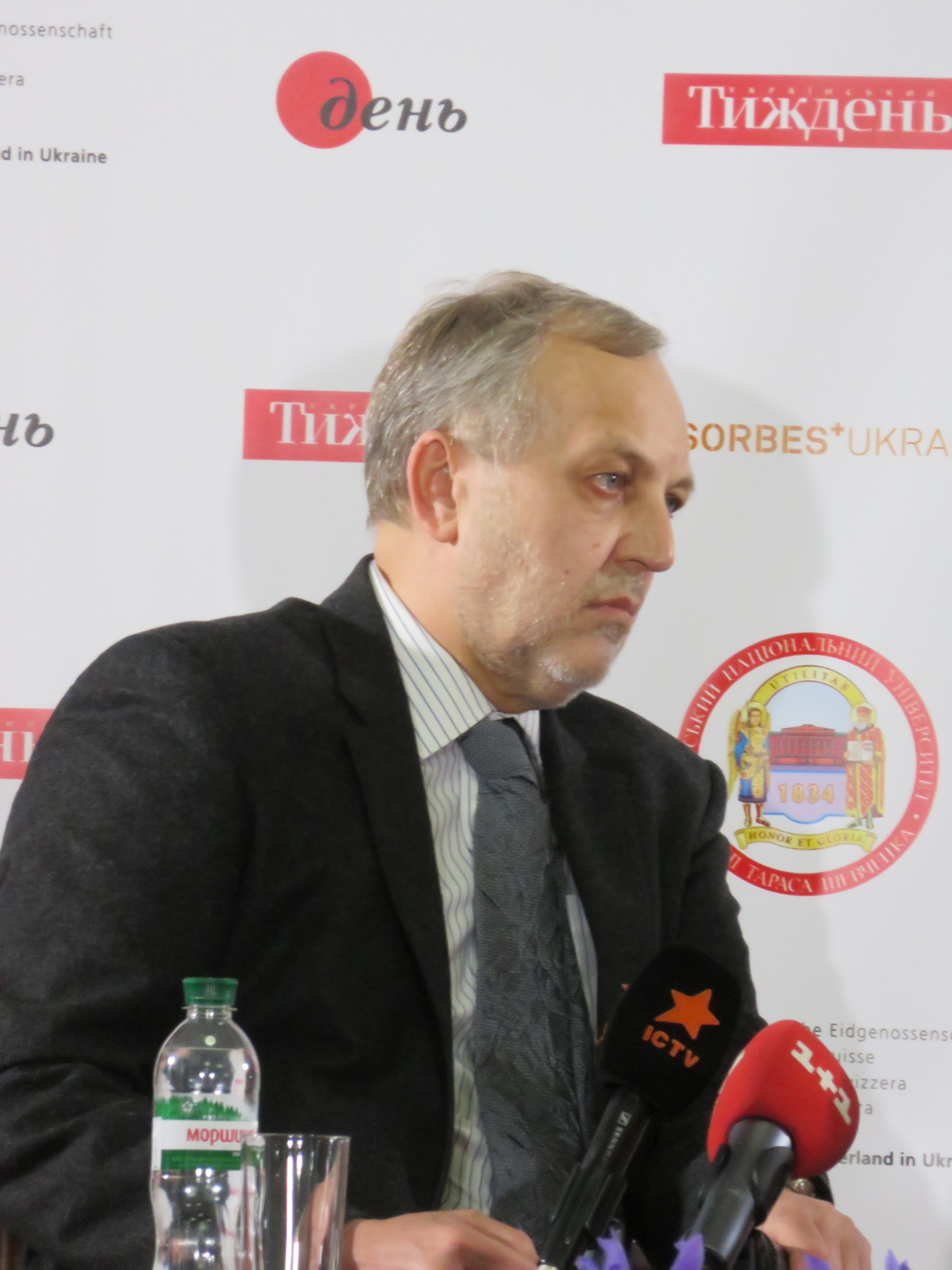
- Born: April 24, 1955 (age 70); Sofia, Bulgaria
- Citizenship: Ukraine
- Education: Taras Shevchenko National University of Kyiv
- Known for: ex editor-in-chief, The Ukrainian Week newsmagazine; ex editor-in-chief, 1+1 (TV channel), host of TV show "Empire of the Cinema"

Yuriy Volodymyrovych Makarov (Ukrainian: Ю́рій Володи́мирович Мака́ров; born April 24, 1955) is a Ukrainian journalist, TV presenter, documentarian, writer of Russian origin. Until 2009, he was the editor-in-chief of the magazine "The Ukrainian Week"; in 2017–2020, Makarov was a member of the board of Suspilne TV, since 2020, its editor-in-chief. Since 2019, he also has been the Chairman of the Taras Shevchenko National Award Committee of Ukraine. Honored Journalist of Ukraine. Member of PEN Ukraine.

== Biography ==
He was born in Sofia, the capital of Bulgaria, in a family of Russian emigrants. His father is a chemist, a political prisoner in 1973–1978, later moved to France. Mother is a chamber singer, soloist of Ukrkoncert and the Kyiv Philharmonic.

Graduated from Taras Shevchenko Kyiv National University, faculty of Romano-Germanic philology (1972–77), where he studied under Kostiantyn Tyshchenko guidance. In 1977–1980, he was a laboratory assistant at the Department of Languages, a teacher of French at the Kyiv Conservatory.

In 1980–1987, he was a correspondent, reviewer of the industrial and economic editorial office, Radio and Telegraph Agency of Ukraine (RATAU).

In 1987–1993, Makarov was editor, director at studio "Kyivnaukfilm".

In 1996, Makarov became a host of the 1+1 programs "Empire of the Cinema", "Telemania", "Breakfast with 1+1", "Special Project of Yuriy Makarov", "Dokument". In 1998, he became the chief editor of the television company.

In 2008-2010, on the First National Channel (now Suspilne), he hosted of the Cultural Front program. From 2011 to 2013, he worked on the "TVi" channel as the host of the "Civilization" and "Civilization 2.0" programs. Since 2015, co-host of the talk show "War and Peace" (together with Yevhen Stepanenko) on the "UA:Pershiy" channel (now Suspilne), in 2017–2020 — member of the board of Suspilne, since 2020 — editor-in-chief of Suspilne.

In the fall of 2007, he headed the magazine "Ukrainian Week", left the position of editor-in-chief in September 2009, and since then has been a permanent columnist of the publication.

Member of the Taras Shevchenko National Award Committee of Ukraine (since December 2016), chairman of the Committee (since December 2019).
