= Victoria Gres =

Ukrainian artist

- Born: 1964 (age 61–62); Baikonur, Kazakhstan
- Education: Moscow State Textile University
- Occupation: Fashion designer
- Labels: Victoria Gres by GRES; Gres DENIM; Gres Décor; Victoria Gres Couture
- Website: victoriagres.shop

Victoria Gres (Ukrainian: Вікторія Юріївна Гресь; born 1964) is a Ukrainian fashion and costume designer. She and other designers are considered to be some of the first Ukrainian fashion designers to emerge after Ukraine gained independence as a country.

== Career ==
Gres began her career in fashion design around 1996. Her collections have been featured in Ukraine, Russia, the United States, and Canada. Her designs are regularly featured during Ukrainian Fashion Week.

Gres' fashion shows are often inspired by films or literary and musical works. In 2014, she staged a show at the Ukrainian Fashion Week to protest the war. In 2019, during the Victoria Gres brand's 26th anniversary, she hosted a fashion show inspired by fairy tales.

In 2008, Gres was a costume designer for the Janet Jackson's Rock Witchu Tour. In 2014, she designed the inauguration dress for the First Lady of Ukraine Maryna Poroshenko. The garment was a silk lavender coat dress with Ukrainian embroidery on the hem and sleeves. It was worn during the first part of the day, during the swearing in ceremony for the President of Ukraine Petro Poroshenko at the Verkhovna Rada and at the Saint Sophia Cathedral, Kyiv.
