= Nadiia Kushnir =

Ukrainian artist

- Born: 28 January 1993 (age 33); Lviv, Ukraine
- Education: Ukrainian Academy of Printing
- Occupations: artist, illustrator, designer
- Website: https://www.nadjozna.com/

Nadiia Kushnir, pseudonym Nadjozna (born 28 January 1993 in Lviv) — a Ukrainian designer and children's book illustrator. She became known as the creator of the online comic strip ‘The Goose’.

== Biography ==
She studied at the Ukrainian Academy of Printing and the Ukrainian Academy of Design.

Organiser and coordinator of the nationwide literary and artistic project ‘Gorytsvit’. Member of an international organisation for non-formal education MitOst.

She has illustrated over 80 books for children, teenagers and adults, including "About Zyuzya the Mosquito" and "Kuzya, Zyuzya and Company" by Vsevolod Nestaiko, "The Alphabet" by Svitlana Kisar, "A Tale of the Curious Kitten" by Johanna Kordis, "Lyalya" by Jacek Denel, and others, for the publishing houses "Veselka", "Urbino", "Vivat", "Kalvaria", "Fundacja Centrum Badan Polska-Ukraina".

In 2017, Nadiia Kushnir was named one of the best children's illustrators in independent Ukraine by the Bukmol website, her best works were named as the illustrations for Tetiana Stus's picture book "Where is Oira?" and her own book "How the Goose Sought His Love".

In 2021, at the age of 28, she was included in Forbes Ukraine's 30 Under 30 list as an illustrator.

2024, due to the Russian invasion of Ukraine, Nadiia with her son relocated to Canada, Ottawa.

== Books ==
- Book-ye: the author’s page
- The Tooth, 2019
- The Navel, 2018
- How the Goose Sought His Love, 2017
