= Alex Moscovitch =

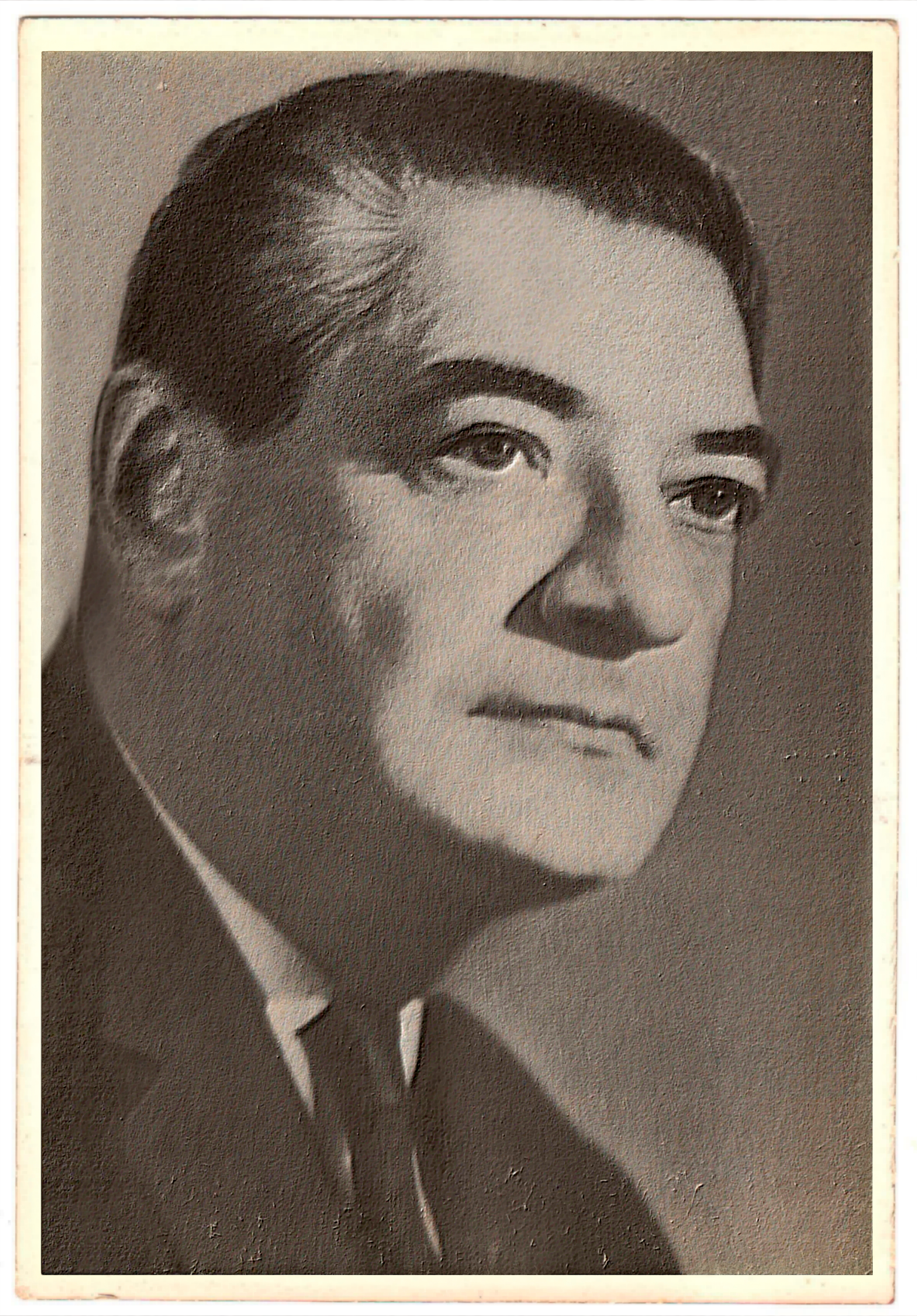

Alex Moscovitch (English: Alex Moskovitch, French: Alex Moscovitch, Ukrainian: Oleksiy Oleksandrovych Moscovitch, Russian: Aleksey Aleksandrovich Moscovitch) (1911 in Kyiv (Kiev) – 1996 in Paris) was a French politician and analyst. He was also an associate and companion of General Charles de Gaulle.

After the Russian Civil War the Moscovitch family emigrated to France. In 1931, Moscovitch's parents returned to Kiev, where his father was executed in 1935. Moscovitch was then serving in the French Armed Forces, so he stayed in France.

== Resistance ==
Alex Moscovitch joins the Free French Forces as of 3 July 1940, then participates on campaigns of Africa, France and Germany.

== City Councillor of Paris ==
From 1947 to 1966, Alex Moscovitch was a city councilor of Paris.

== Algerian War ==
During the debate in the municipal council of Paris, on the 1961 Paris massacre (17 October 1961), Alex Moscovitch makes a remark that will be reproached to him. Anne Chemin in Le Monde, of 17 October 2011, writes: "Le 27 octobre 1961, Claude Bourdet, directeur du magazine France Observateur demande -en vain - une commission d'enquête du conseil municipal de Paris. "Ce qu'il nous faut, c'est très simple et très clair: l'autorisation et suffisamment de bateaux (pour y mettre les Algériens), répond le conseiller Alex Moscovitch. Le problème qui consisterait à faire couler ces bateaux ne relève pas, hélas, du conseil municipal de Paris." ("The weaker, they finished them until death" .The circumstances of the death of a hundred Algerian demonstrators killed by the police on October 17, 1961, in Paris, have long been overshadowed: "On October 27, 1961, Claude Bourdet, director of the magazine France Observateur, asked in vain for a commission of inquiry from the Paris municipal council. What we need is very simple and clear: the authorization and enough boats (to put the Algerians there), "replied Councilor Alex Moscovitch. The problem of sinking these boats is not, alas, the responsibility of the municipal council of Paris.")

== Important dates in life and work ==
- 1940-1945 - officer of the troops of "Free France" (anti-Nazi movement) Free French Forces (French: France Libre and Forces françaises libres), organized and led by Charles de Gaulle. Alex Moscovitch was awarded an The National Order of the Legion of Honour (French: Ordre national de la Légion d'honneur) Legion of Honour for successful military operations behind the enemy lines, on the territory of Nazi occupied.
- 1946-1970 - one of the leaders of Charles de Gaulle's parties The Rally of the French People (French: Rassemblement du Peuple Français or RPF) and The Union for the New Republic (French: L'Union pour la nouvelle République, UNR).
- 1947-1966 - a Councillor - Municipal council (France) (French: conseil municipal) member of the Council of Paris (Conseil de Paris).
- 1965-1977 - deputy mayor of Paris and deputy head of Paris Police Prefecture. Possessing a talent in urban planning, Alex Moscovitch was one of the creators of the modern appearance of the district La Défense.
- 1989-1991 - Counselor to the President of Mikhail Gorbachev.
- 1991-1996 - Financial adviser of Strategic management in economic planning of President of Kazakhstan, Nursultan Nazarbayev. Astana received its concept of modern architectural style under the influence of thoughts and visions of Alex Moscovitch about the idea of the city of the future.

== Publications ==
- Le Temps des Puaises (Mar 24, 1977; ISBN 978-2710316879), a book of memories about French politics and personal life

== Bibliography ==
- Philippe Nivet. Le Conseil municipal de Paris de 1944 à 1977, Publications de la Sorbonne, 1994
- Simon Sadler. The Situationist City. MIT Press, 1999 ISBN 0262692252, ISBN 9780262692250
