= The Ukrainian Week =

Ukrainian illustrated weekly magazine

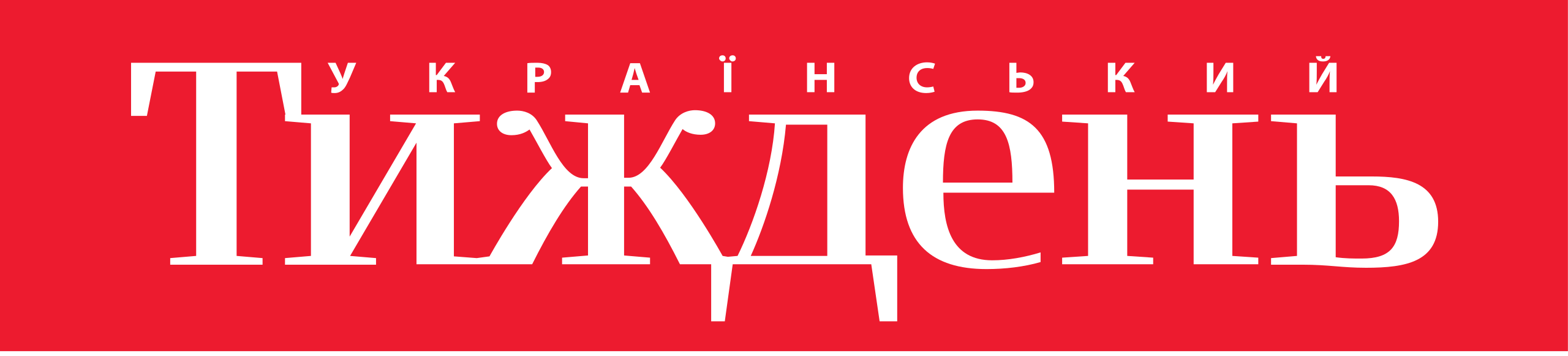

- Ukrainskyi Tyzhden's front cover issue 2014:5.
- Chief editor: Serhiy Lytvynenko
- Categories: Newsmagazine
- Frequency: Weekly
- Circulation: 41,500 weekly
- First issue: 2 November 2007; 18 years ago
- Final issue: 23 February 2022 (continues to appear in online version)
- Company: TOV Ukrainskyi Tyzhden
- Country: Ukraine
- Based in: Kyiv
- Language: Ukrainian, English (print), French (on-line)
- Website: tyzhden.ua (Ukrainian edition), ukrainianweek.com (English edition)
- ISSN: 1996-1561

The Ukrainian Week (Ukrainian: Український Тиждень, romanized: Ukrainskyi Tyzhden, pronounced [ʊkrɐˈjinʲsʲkɪj ˈtɪʒdenʲ]) is a Ukrainian online magazine, which initially appeared as an illustrated weekly news outlet covering politics, economics and the arts and aimed at the socially engaged Ukrainian-language reader. It provides a range of analysis, opinion, interviews, feature pieces, including travel both in Ukraine and outside, and art reviews and events calendar. Its first editor-in-chief was Yuriy Makarov.

== History and profile ==
The Ukrainian Week is published in Ukraine by ECEM Media Ukraine GmbH (Austria), and was established in November 2007. The magazine is one of several Ukrainian language magazines that have appeared in Ukraine in the wake of the Orange Revolution.

The English edition of The Ukrainian Week is published bi-monthly and contains a selection of articles deemed to be of most interest to non-Ukrainian readers.

In 2012, it published its statement accusing the state powers and major media-holdings de facto monopolizing the market, of harassment.

Since the beginning of the full-scale Russian invasion of Ukraine on 24 February 2022, the magazine has only been available in a digital version. Its last printed edition, dated with 23 February 2022, couldn't be produced and is only available in digital format.

== Awards ==
In April 2008, by the decision of Wikipedia activists, the editorial board of the Ukrainian Week magazine was awarded the highest award of the Ukrainian Wikipedia, the "Condensed milk with cream", for the article "Let's Wikify", which draws readers' attention to the phenomenon of the Ukrainian Wikipedia and calls for participation in its content.

== See also ==
List of magazines in Ukraine
