= Tetiana Protcheva =

Ukrainian artist

Tetiana Protcheva is recognized as a Ukrainian master of embroidery. She has exhibited her masterpieces in the United States, Expo 2020 Dubai, EXPO 2005 Japan, EXPO 2010 Shanghai, Australia, Scotland, Israel, Japan, France, Brazil, Sweden and many other countries. In the summer of 2010, Tetiana represented Ukraine at EXPO 2010 in China.

== Life and work ==
Protcheva was interested in embroidery since childhood. Her favorite colors and themes tell the ancient history of Ukraine; she uses black and red – the colors of the central region of Ukraine – with traditional simple designs, and regular geometrical shapes.

Protcheva designs clothes. She took sewing classes at school and then later in life started designing and sewing men's neckties. Her son proudly wore one of her neckties to school and came home with a smile on his face as he told his mother, "You have an order for more neckties." Now Protcheva decorates sweaters, jackets, blouses, and shirts with Ukrainian ornaments.

Protcheva invented the 3D embroidery style, which entered the Book of Records of Ukraine and created a new direction entitled "Glowing Art." Working under the Glow Gallery international project, she has come up with a unique collection of embroidered portraits of prominent personalities, such as Steve Jobs, Andy Warhol, Leonardo da Vinci, and Jesus Christ that glow in the dark, as if coming back to life, and produce an unforgettable emotional and cultural effect.

In order to spread information about embroidery as the grand unifying symbol of Ukraine and present a positive image of the country, Pretcheva decided to create an embroidered map of Ukraine. Every oblast of Ukraine is embroidered on the map by artists of that oblast. According to the design, the symbols of the map reflect their respective ethnic regions. The project involved craftspeople to study, renovate, revive, preserve and demonstrate ancient multi-century heritage of spiritual culture, and to implement it harmoniously into the modern culture.

== See also ==
- Фіалко Д. Побачити світ крізь вушко голки [Текст] / Д. Фіалко // Україна молода. — 2011. — No. 135.
