= Svitlana Biedarieva =

Ukrainian art historian, artist, and curator

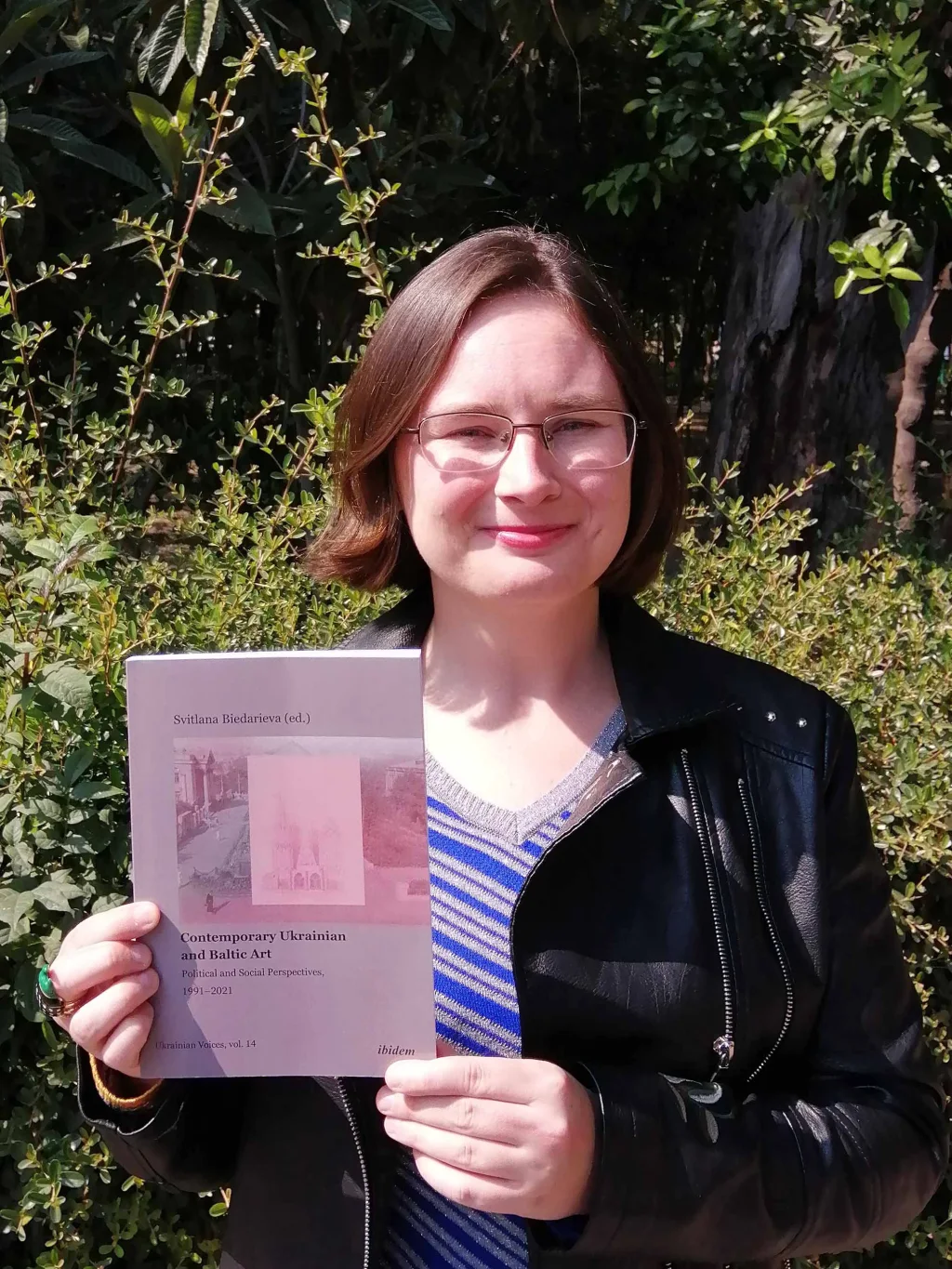
Svitlana Biedarieva

Svitlana Biedarieva is a Ukrainian art historian, artist, and curator, working in the topics of Ukrainian wartime art after 2014, decoloniality in Ukrainian culture, and Ukrainian anti-colonial resistance through art. She also works within a comparative perspective on East European and Latin American modern and contemporary art history.

== Education ==
Biedarieva received her PhD in History of Art from the Courtauld Institute of Art, University of London.

== Career ==
Since the onset of the war in 2014, Biedarieva closely works on the topics of resistance to violence, anti-objectification, and decolonial disentanglement in wartime Ukraine, as well as the war documentation by Ukrainian artists. As a curator, she aims at establishing a productive collaboration between Ukraine and the Global South, with a particular attention to Latin America. Her co-curatd exhibition At the Front Line. Ukrainian Art, 2013-2019 aimed at examining a comparative perspective and included a show at the National Museum of Cultures in Mexico City, in collaboration with the National Cinematheque of Mexico and the Museum of Memory and Tolerance. This has become the first large-scale cultural project focused on contemporary Ukraine in Latin America. The exhibition further travelled to Canada where it received positive reviews.

Svitlana Biedarieva is the author of the book Ambicoloniality and War: The Ukrainian-Russian Case, published by Palgrave Macmillan in 2024. She is the editor of the books Art in Ukraine Between Identity Construction and Anti-Colonial Resistance, published by Routledge in 2024, Contemporary Ukrainian and Baltic Art: Political and Social Perspectives, 1991-2021, published by ibidem Press in 2021, and co-editor of At the Front Line: Ukrainian Art, 2013-2019, published by Editorial 17 in 2020. Biedarieva has published her texts in such academic journals and media outlets as October, Art Margins, Space and Culture, post.MoMA, Financial Times, The Burlington Contemporary, and The Art Newspaper, among others. Biedarieva is a member of editorial board of the "Ukrainian Voices" series published by the German publishing house ibidem Press.

Her art focuses on resistance to Russia's war against Ukraine. Biedarieva's works have been exhibited in the United Kingdom, Mexico, Estonia, the United States, Ukraine, Cuba, Finland, and Germany. Her graphic art project The Morphology of War (2017-2023) explores dehumanizing qualities of Russia's war against Ukraine.
