= Sergei Denisov (ice hockey) =

Russian ice hockey player

- Born: May 12, 1990 (age 34); Moscow, Russian SFSR, Soviet Union
- Height: 6 ft 0 in (183 cm)
- Weight: 163 lb (74 kg; 11 st 9 lb)
- Position: Goaltender
- Catches: Left
- KHL team Former teams: Free Agent; HC Vityaz
- NHL draft: Undrafted
- Playing career: 2008–present

Sergei Alekseyevich Denisov (born May 12, 1990) is a Russian professional ice hockey goaltender who is currently an unrestricted free agent.

Denisov played with HC Vityaz Podolsk of the Kontinental Hockey League (KHL) during the 2012–13 season.
