= Daria Denisova =

Ukrainian artist (born 1989)

Denisova Daria
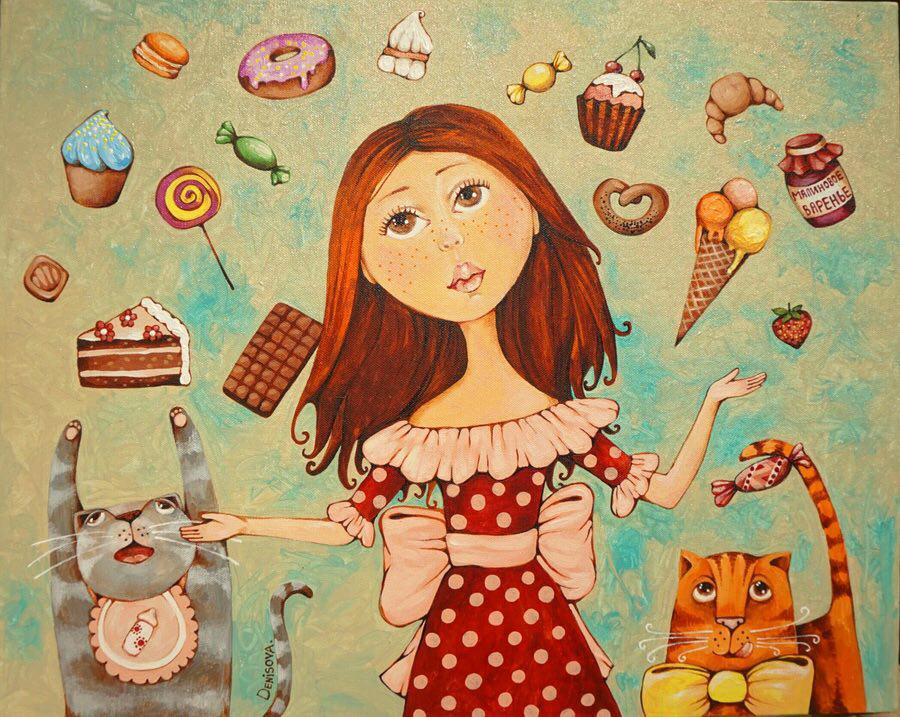
- One of the Happy Art paintings
- Born: Денисова Дар'я Андріївна; July 19, 1989 (age 36); Kharkiv
- Education: Kharkiv State Academy of Design and Fine Arts
- Movement: Happy Art
- Website: denisova.com.ua

Denisova Daria (born 19 July 1989) is a Ukrainian painter, book illustrator, member of Ukrainian national painters community.

== Life ==
Daria was born into a family of artists. Her father, Denisov Andrew, is a painter-muralist. Daria's mother, Denisova Svetlana, works as an architect. Nowadays Svetlana manages children art-school. Daria's parents have grown up her passion for arts from the childhood. They also helped Daria to master different art techniques and to level up her skills. Daria became the student of the art high school in the age of 15. She graduated Kharkiv State Academy of Design and Fine Arts in the age of 22. Daria joined the Ukrainian national painters community in 2015.

== Education ==
2004–06 Artist High School of Kharkiv
2006–12 Kharkiv State Academy of Design and Fine Arts.
Became a member of young painters' community in 2015

== Arts ==
Daria's paintings can be found on numerous exhibitions, fine art galleries and private collections in the United States, Europe, Russia, Ukraine, India and Israel.

Cats are the most common characters on Daria's scenes. Daria calls it the "Happy Art" movement. She get inspiration from the overseas travelling and from the family circle. Daria started to experiment with techniques of different kinds from the very childhood. She even painted a church in a town of Buddy, Ukraine. Together with her husband Daria visited such countries, as United States, Spain, Cambodia, Thailand, India, Sri Lanka, Montenegro, Serbia, Bosnia and Herzegovina etc. Every journey has inspired Daria to create a brand new collection of painting. All of them are exhibited both in the Ukraine and abroad.
