= Roman Denisov (footballer, born 1986) =

Russian footballer

Personal information
- Full name: Roman Vasilyevich Denisov
- Date of birth: 15 March 1986 (age 40)
- Height: 1.87 m (6 ft 2 in)
- Position: Goalkeeper

Youth career
- Zenit St. Petersburg

Senior career*
Years	Team	Apps	(Gls)
2003–2004	Zenit St. Petersburg	0	(0)
2005–2006	Petrotrest St. Petersburg	27	(0)
- * Club domestic league appearances and goals

Roman Vasilyevich Denisov (Russian: Роман Васильевич Денисов; born 15 March 1986) is a former Russian football goalkeeper.

== Career ==
Denisov spent two seasons with Zenit U-21 team. In 2005 he played in Russian Football National League for Petrotrest.
